= Traditional Native American titles =

Native American titles

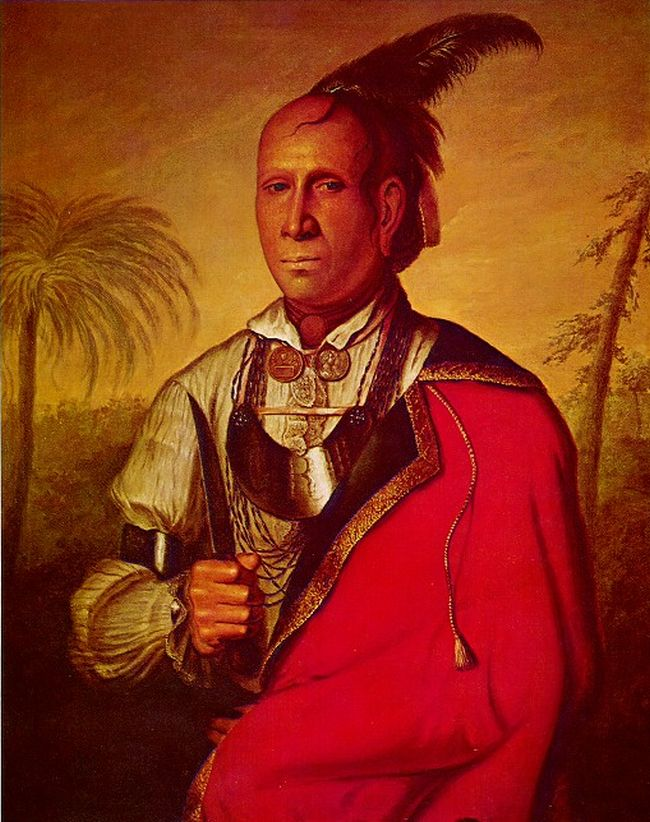
Standing Turkey (Conocotocko, or Cunne Shote) c.1760, was First Beloved Man of the Cherokee

Traditional Native American Titles include several that have been mis-interpreted as actual names of individuals in the past. Several historic Native American leaders are known today only by their titles, as opposed to their actual tribal names. For instance, mankiller (Outacite) and pathkiller were Cherokee ranks—not names—yet several individuals are only identified in history by these titles, causing historians confusion that often resulted in their lives being conflated.

== Cherokee ==
- Principal Chief of the Cherokee. Cherokee settlements during most of the eighteenth century would appoint a leader (usually for negotiations with the Europeans), who would often refer to them as 'emperors' or 'kings' of the Cherokee. The Cherokee themselves called these temporary leaders the 'Uku'. After the 1794 establishment of the Cherokee Nation, the leadership became more formalized and permanent. This created the rank of "principal chief", equivalent to a national president or prime minister of the day.
- First Beloved Man, or Uku. The Cherokee people as a whole were historically connected by a decentralized and loose confederacy of towns, villages, and settlements. Before 1794, these settlements were run by an elected Uku (mostly chosen from the ranks of the white or red chiefs). Although this person was not a chief in the literal sense, he was respected by the inhabitants, who deferred to the First Beloved Man in dealings with other towns and settlements, other tribes or peoples, and European colonial governments.
- First Beloved Woman or Ghigau (Cherokee: ᎩᎦᎤ), (Note: also Agigaue (Cherokee:ᎠᎩᎦᎤᎡ).) is a Cherokee prestigious title meaning "beloved woman" or "war woman".
- White Chief, or Peace Chief.
- Red Chief, War Chief, or Skiagusta (ᎠᏍᎦᏯᎬᏍᏔ), (Note: /ˌskaɪəˈɡʌstə/ (ᎠᏍᎦᏯᎬᏍᏔ, asgayagvsta), also spelled skyagusta, skiagunsta, asgayagusta, or syacust.) (Note: Cherokee has 17 verb tenses, 10 persons, and six tones. See Neal, Dale (September 21, 2020). "Cracking the code to speak Cherokee". Asheville Citizen-Times.)/ˌskaɪəˈɡʌstə/ is a Cherokee title for a war chief, known as the red chief in times of turmoil. The skiagusta was the highest possible rank for a 'red chief'. The red chief remained subordinate to the council of the 'white', or peace, chief in non-tactical matters, even during wartime. Skiagusta was the highest rank in the war council hierarchy, and stood immediately above the rank of outacité ("mankiller"). Most notable were Dragging Canoe, Young Tassel, and Doublehead.
- Mankiller or Outacité (Note: From Untsi-tee-hee, literally translated as 'man killer.' Killing a man in battle was a requirement to attaining the rank.). This rank was considered the equivalent of the British rank of colonel during the French and Indian War, standing above the rank of pathkiller. Most notably, Ostenaco Utsidihi, and Oukah, a leader of Tasseta Town, who visited England in 1730.
- Pathkiller, was a Cherokee rank—not a name. (Note: There were several southeastern tribal members known only as Pathkiller; their original names are lost to history.) One Chrokee leader known by that title fought against the Overmountain Men and Wataugan frontiersmen who had settled in the Washington District at the outbreak of the American Revolutionary War. The most notable, known, rank holder was The Ridge.
- Raven, or scout. (Note: From Chronicles of Oklahoma: The names Outacité and Raven were warrior (military) titles, conferred for bravery. Both were common throughout the Cherokee country, several individual bearing the rank at the same time. They were identified by adding the name of their town, as in the "Raven of Echota.") Ravens scouted ahead of war parties to search for the enemy. According to historian Colin Calloway, "Every Cherokee town had them." The most notable of this rank was the Savanukah, a Raven of Chota.

== Muscogee ==
- Civil chief, or Micco.
- War chief (or Tustenuggee tvstvnvke in Muscogee), was a Creek title for the war chief of a tribal town. Appointed by the micco, the war chief was responsible for leading the towns' warriors and advising the civil chief on matters relating to war and the public order.

== See also ==
- Cherokee military history
