= Charles Thompson (Cherokee chief) =

Cherokee chief

- ᎤᏤᎴᏛ
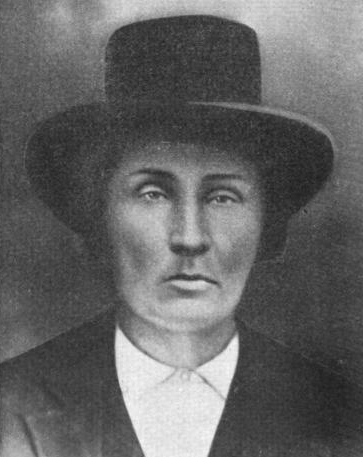

Principal Chief of the Cherokee Nation
- In office 1875–1879
- Preceded by: William P. Ross
- Succeeded by: Dennis Bushyhead

Member of the Cherokee Nation Senate from the Delaware District
- In office 1867–1873
- Preceded by: Jeter Lynch Thompson

Personal details
- Born: Utselata
- Died: June 22, 1891 Delaware District, Cherokee Nation, Indian Territory, U.S.
- Citizenship: Cherokee

Charles Thompson (Cherokee: ᎤᏤᎴᏛ, romanized: Utselata, also spelled Oochelata) was a Cherokee politician who served as the Principal Chief of the Cherokee Nation from 1875 to 1879. He previously served in the Cherokee Senate from 1867 to 1873.

== Early life, family and education ==
Charles Thompson was born Utselata in the Cherokee Nation prior to the Trail of Tears to a full blood Cherokee father and a European mother. (Note: Both spellings Utselata and Oochelata are used.) His mother had been kidnapped at a young age and raised by Cherokees. She only spoke Cherokee. The family migrated west to Indian Territory during the Trail of Tears, and settled near the present-day Delaware County, Oklahoma.

Thompson attended the Baptist Mission School, where he was strongly influenced by the Reverend Evan Jones and John B. Jones and joined the Baptist church. Utselata joined the Keetoowah Society in 1859, when it was founded by John B. Jones. The abolition of slavery was one of the society's goals. Before the civil war, he worked as an attorney and actively conspired against slaveholders.

== Civil War military service ==
He enlisted in the 1st Cherokee Mounted Rifles, a Confederate unit commanded by John Drew. He rescinded his enlistment and joined the Third Indian Home Guards as a corporal on July 11, 1862. This unit, commanded by Lieutenant Colonel Lewis Downing, served with the Union Army. Utselata continued to serve through the rest of the war.

== Post-war life ==
At the end of the Civil War, Utselata moved to a place on Spavinaw Creek, near the present-day town of Eucha, Oklahoma, where he established a farm. He occasionally practiced law before the tribal courts.

In 1867 he was elected to the Senate of the Cherokee Nation, where he represented the Delaware District until 1873 and he served as Principal Chief of the Cherokee Nation from 1875 to 1879. During this time, he took the Anglicized name Charles Thompson. The surname honored Dr. Jeter Lynch Thompson, his predecessor in the Senate. He used that name from then until his death. During his tenure as principal chief, he feuding with the Cherokee Supreme Court, leading some to criticize him as dictatorial. He was more politically radical than his predecessors and his tenure began what historian Noah Ramage called the Cherokee Nation's "radical reconstruction" period.

He was a Baptist deacon, preaching each Sunday at the church in Eucha in the Cherokee language. The church denied him ordination as a minister because of a policy that prevented lawyers from becoming ordained ministers. This alleged disqualification was waived when he became principal chief.

== Death and burials ==
Charles Thompson died June 22, 1891, and was buried in the Indian cemetery at Eucha. The town of Eucha, including the cemetery, was relocated before Lake Eucha was completed in 1952. He was reburied just inside the new cemetery. A military stone at the grave honors his service to the Union during the Civil War.

== Works cited ==
- Conley, Robert (2007). A Cherokee Encyclopedia. University of New Mexico Press. ISBN 9780826339539.
- Meserve, John Bartlett (1938). "Chief Lewis Downing and Chief Charles Thompson (Oochalata.)" (PDF). Chronicles of Oklahoma. 16 (3): 315–325.
- Ramage, Noah (2024). Phoenix on Fire: The Cherokee Nation from Reconstruction to Denationalization (PDF) (PhD thesis). Berkeley, California: University of California Berkeley.

Preceded by William P. Ross	Principal Chief of the Cherokee Nation; 1875–1879	Succeeded by Dennis Bushyhead
