= List of Principal Chiefs of the Cherokee =

Federally recognized tribe chief executives

Principal Chief is today the title of the chief executives of the Cherokee Nation, of the Eastern Band of Cherokee Indians, and of the United Keetoowah Band of Cherokee Indians, the three federally recognized tribes of Cherokee. In the eighteenth century, when the people were primarily organized by clans and towns, they would appoint a leader for negotiations with the Europeans. They called him Uku, or "First Beloved Man".

The title of "Principal Chief" was created in 1794, when the Cherokee began to formalize a more centralized political structure. They founded the original Cherokee Nation. The Cherokee Nation–East adopted a written constitution in 1827, creating a government with three branches: legislative, executive, and judicial. The Principal Chief was elected by the National Council, which was the legislature of the Nation. The Cherokee Nation–West adopted a similar constitution in 1833. In 1839 most of the reunited nation was reunited in Indian Territory, after forced removal from the Southeast. There they adopted one constitution. In 1868, the Eastern Band of Cherokee, made up of those who had managed to remain primarily in the homelands of North Carolina, created a separate and distinct constitution and formalized the position of Principal Chief. The position had existed in the east since the time of Yonaguska. Their descendants make up the members of the federally recognized Eastern Band of Cherokee Indians today, referred to as the EBCI.

In 1906, the US government dismantled the Cherokee Nation's governmental structure under the Dawes Act (except for allowing the tribe to retain limited authority to deal with remaining land issues, a provision that lasted until June 1914). This act also provided for the allotment of communal lands and extinguishing of Cherokee land title in preparation for admission of Oklahoma as a state in 1907. Following passage of the federal Indian Reorganization Act of 1934 and the Oklahoma Indian Welfare Act of 1936, the Keetoowah Nighthawk Society organized in 1939 as the United Keetoowah Band. The Bureau of Indian Affairs approved their constitution in 1940.

The United States President began appointing a Principal Chief for the non-UKB Cherokee in 1941. In 1975, these Cherokee drafted their constitution as the Cherokee Nation of Oklahoma, which was ratified on June 26, 1976. In 1999, they approved several changes to the constitution, including the removal of the qualifying phrase "of Oklahoma" from their name, leaving it simply "Cherokee Nation".

== Early leaders ==
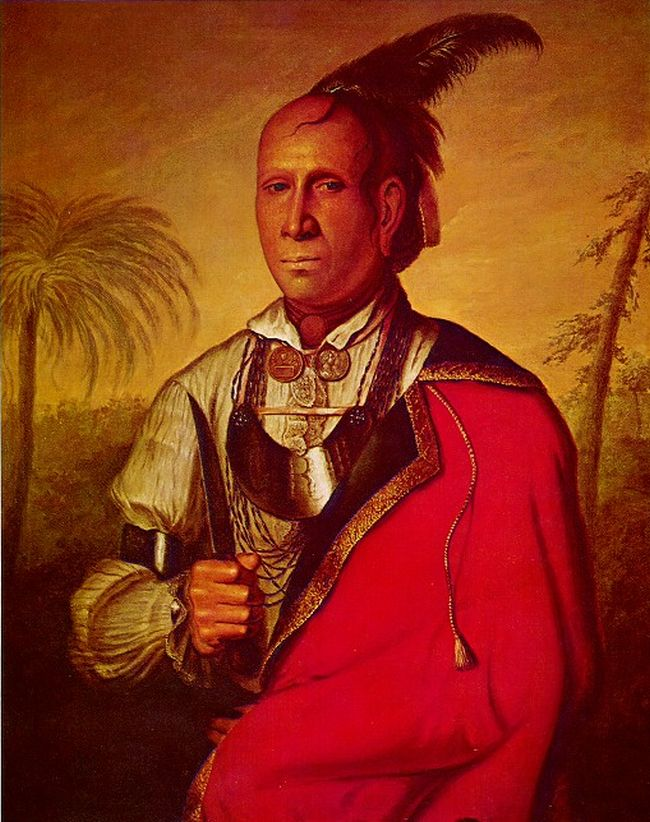
Cunne Shote, Cherokee Chief, by Francis Parsons (English), 1762, oil on canvas, Gilcrease Museum

Before 1794, the Cherokee had no standing national government. Their structure was based on clans and towns, which had various leaders. The clans had functions within each town and within the tribe. The towns appointed their own leaders to represent the tribe to British, French, and (later) American authorities. They typically had both peace ("white") and war ("red") chiefs. The range of aboriginal titles were usually translated by the English as "chief," but the Cherokee called their headmen of towns and villages "Beloved Man." The term "emperor" is placed in quotation marks, since this title was created by British emissary Sir Alexander Cuming; it was not accepted by the tribe as a whole.

- Outacite (d. 1729), peace chief, signed a 1720 treaty with Governor Francis Nicholson; outacite is his title rather than his given name
- Charitey Hagey of Tugaloo (1716–1721)
- Long Warrior of Tanasi (1729–1730)
- Wrosetasetow, "emperor" of the Cherokee until 1730; his given name was Ama-edohi or "water-goer", and he served as a trade commissioner
- Moytoy of Tellico (also known as Ama-edohi); (d. 1741), declared "emperor" by British emissary, Alexander Cuming, from 1730 until 1741
- Attakullakulla (or "Little Carpenter", also spelled Ada-gal'kala, Attacullaculla, Oukou-naka) (1708/1711–1780), "white" peace chief from Echota recognized as primary chief by the British, or "president of the nation" from 1762 to 1778
- Amouskositte (or Ammouskossittee, Amascossite, Ammonscossittee, Amosgasite, "Dreadfulwater") of Great Tellico (b. ca. 1728), served as "emperor" 1741–1753, son of Moytoy
- Old Hop (or Guhna-gadoga, Kanagatucko, and "Standing Turkey")(1753–1756), war chief from Echota; either Ammouskossitte's uncle or father.
- Moytoy of Citico (or Amo-adaw-ehi), war chief during the Anglo-Cherokee War (1759–1761), nephew of the Moytoy of Tellico.
- Uka Ulah (also Ukah Ulah) (d. 1761), "emperor;" nephew of Old Hop,
- Conocotocko II (or Cunne Shote), traveled to England in 1762 with Henry Timberlake
- Outacite of Keowee (ca. 1703–ca. 1780) (also known as "Judd's Friend", Outacity, Outassite, Outacite, Outassatah, Wootasite, Wrosetasetow, Ostenaco, Outassete, Scyacust Ukah); he met Anglo-American emissary Henry Timberlake when the latter went to Overhill country, and traveled with him to England in 1762
- Oconostota (also known as Ogan'sto', "Groundhog Sausage") (1712–1781), red war chief of Echota; served entire tribe 1778–1785
- Savanukah of Chota (1781–1783)
- Old Tassel (or "Corntassel," "Tassel," Kaiyatahee) (d. 1788), peace chief from Echota, served 1783–1788
- Raven of Chota (or Colonah), war chief; nephew of Oconostota
- Little Turkey, served 1788–1794
  - opposed by Hanging Maw (or Scolaguta), served 1788–1794

=== Chickamauga/Lower Cherokee (1777–1809) ===
In 1777, Dragging Canoe and a large body of Cherokee, primarily from Tennessee, separated from the bands that had signed treaties of peace with the Americans during the American Revolution. They migrated first to the Chickamauga (now Chattanooga, Tennessee) region, then to the "Five Lower Towns" area – further west and southwest of there – in order to continue fighting (see Cherokee–American wars). In time, these Chickamauga Cherokee comprised a majority of the nation, due to both sympathy with their cause and the destruction of the homes of other Cherokee who later joined them. The separation ended at a reunification council with the Cherokee Nation in 1809.

Chiefs:

- Dragging Canoe (1777–1792)
- John Watts (1792–1802)
- Doublehead, brother of Old Tassel (1802–1807)
- Tagwadihi, or the Glass (1807–1809)

== Cherokee Nation East (1794–1839) ==
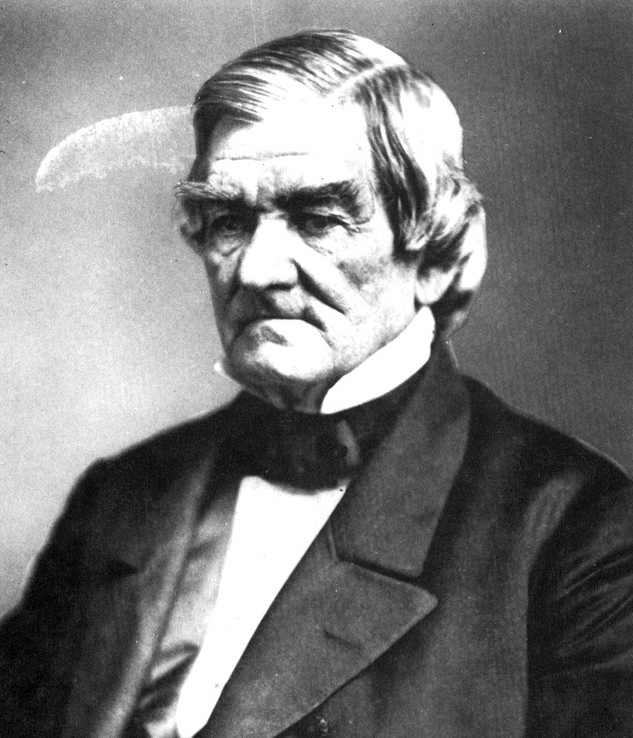
John Ross, c. 1866

Little Turkey was elected First Beloved Man of the Cherokee (the council seat of which was shifted south to Ustanali (later known as New Echota), near what is now Calhoun, Georgia) in the aftermath of the assassination by frontiersmen of Corntassel (also called Cornsilk) and several other leaders. Hanging Maw of Coyatee, listed above, claimed the title as his right by tradition, as he was the headman of the Upper Towns. Many Cherokee and the US government recognized him as Principal Chief. Little Turkey was finally recognized as "Principal Chief of the Cherokee Nation" by all the towns after the end of the Cherokee–American wars, when the Cherokee established their first nominal national government.

- Little Turkey (1794–1801)
- Black Fox (1801–1811)
- Pathkiller (1811–1827)
  - Big Tiger (1824–1828); self-proclaimed chief of a faction of those following Whitepath's teachings (which were inspired by Seneca prophet Handsome Lake)
- Charles R. Hicks (1827), de facto head of government from 1813
- William Hicks (1827–1828)
- John Ross (1828–1839)
  - William Hicks (1833–1835), elected principal chief of the faction supporting emigration to the west

== Cherokee Nation West (1810–1839) ==
Originally settling along the St. Francis and White rivers in what was classified first as Spanish Louisiana and later Arkansas Territory after the United States acquired it, the Western Cherokee eventually migrated to Indian Territory in 1828 after the Treaty of Washington. They named their capital there Tahlontiskee. John Jolly died while the Latecomers were arriving, and John Looney succeeded him automatically. Looney was deposed by the council and replaced with Brown; his supporters wanted to put the Cherokee Nation West in a better position vis-a-vis the Ross party of Cherokee Nation East.

The removal of the eastern Cherokee Territory took place in 1839. It was followed by the executions in June 1839 of Major Ridge, John Ridge, and Elias Boudinot (Treaty party members who had aligned with the Old Settlers). At that time, the council deposed Brown, replacing him with Looney. A sizable faction of the Old Settlers refused to recognize Looney and elected Rogers in his stead, but their efforts to maintain autonomy petered out the next year.

- The Bowl (1810–1813)
- Takatoka, or Degadoga (1813–1817)
- Tahlonteeskee (1817–1819)
- John Jolly (1819–1838)
- John Looney (1838–1839)
- John Brown (1839)
- John Looney (1839)
- John Rogers (1839–1840)

== Eastern Band of Cherokee Indians (1824–present) ==
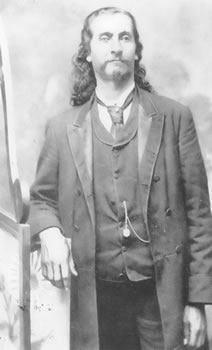
Nimrod Jarret Smith (1837–1893) was 4th Principal Chief of the Eastern Band and a Confederate Army veteran of the Thomas' Legion of Cherokee Indians and Highlanders.

The Eastern Band of Cherokee Indians is made up of descendants of Cherokee primarily from along the Oconaluftee River in western North Carolina, in today's Cherokee County (see Qualla Boundary). The band formed after the treaties of 1817 and 1819 were made between the Cherokee Nation East and the US government; they were outside the former territory. They were later joined by Utsala's band from the Nantahala River in western North Carolina, and those few from the Valley Towns who managed to remain in 1838 following the removal of most of the Cherokee to Indian Territory.

Principal chiefs:

- Yonaguska (1824–1839)
- Salonitah, or Flying Squirrel (1870–1875)
- Lloyd R. Welch (1875–1880)
- Nimrod Jarrett Smith (1880–1891)
- Stillwell Saunooke (1891–1895)
- Andy Standing Deer (1895–1899)
- Jesse Reed (1899–1903)
- Bird Saloloneeta, or Young Squirrel (1903–1907)
- John Goins Welch (1907–1911)
- Joseph A. Saunooke (1911–1915)
- David Blythe (1915–1919)
- Joseph A. Saunooke (1919–1923)
- Sampson Owl (1923–1927)
- John A. Tahquette (1927–1931)
- Jarret Blythe (1931–1947)
- Henry Bradley (1947–1951)
- Osley Bird Saunooke (1951–1955)
- Jarret Blythe (1955–1959)
- Osley Bird Saunooke (1959–1963)
- Jarret Blythe (1963–1967)
- Walter Jackson (1967–1971)
- Noah Powell (1971–1973)
- John A. Crowe (1973–1983)
- Robert S. Youngdeer (1983–1987)
- Jonathan L. Taylor (1987–1995)
- Gerard Parker (1995)
- Joyce Dugan (1995–1999)
- Leon Jones (1999–2003)
- Michell Hicks (2003–2015)
- Patrick Lambert (2015–2017)
- Richard Sneed (2017–2023)
- Michell Hicks (2023–present)

Two principal chiefs of the tribe have been impeached since the late 20th century: Jonathan L. Taylor in 1995 and Patrick Lambert in 2017.

== Cherokee Nation in Indian Territory (1839–1907) ==
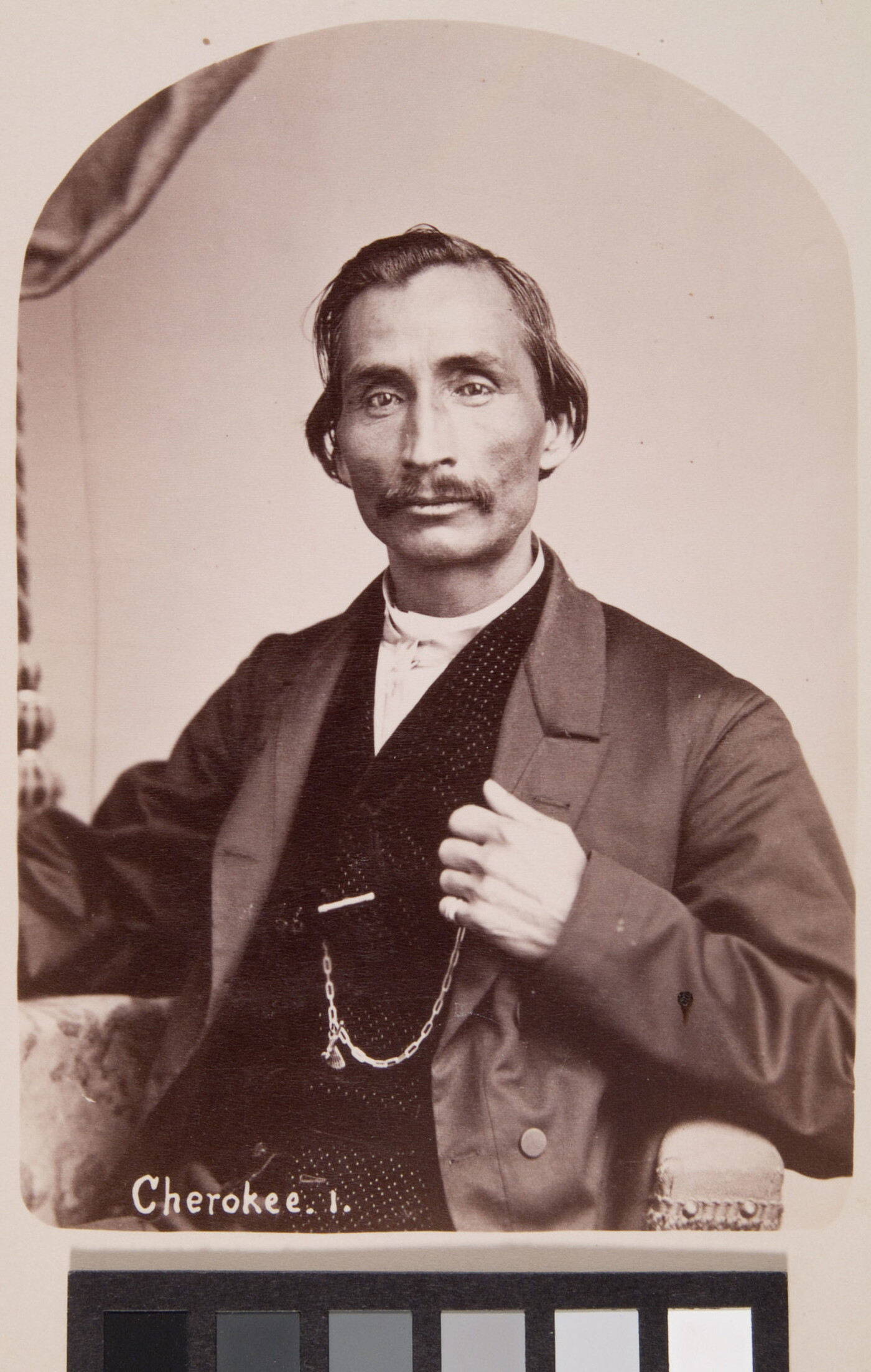
Lewis Downing

After removal of the eastern Cherokee to Indian Territory on the Trail of Tears, they created a new constitution to unify the former Eastern Cherokee with the Western Cherokee. This allowed for direct election of the Principal Chief. Though a holdout minority of the Old Settlers elected John Rogers as their principal chief, his government never gained further support and soon faded away.

The John Ross faction abandoned the established capital of Tahlontiskee and built Tahlequah instead. During the American Civil War, the Nation voted to support the Confederacy against the Union, and Ross acquiesced for a time. In 1862, however, he and many of his supporters fled to Washington, D.C. At that time Stand Watie, serving as a Confederate officer, was elected Principal Chief by a portion of the Nation. The remaining Ross group never supported Watie's election, though, and lived apart under their own officials.

- John Ross (1839–1866)
  - Thomas Pegg, acting principal chief of the Union Cherokee (1862–1863)
  - Smith Christie, acting principal chief of the Union Cherokee (1863)
  - Lewis Downing, acting principal chief of the Union Cherokee (1864–1866)
  - Stand Watie, Confederate recognized chief (1862–1866)
- Lewis Downing (1866)
- William P. Ross (1866–1867)
- Lewis Downing (1867–1872)
- William P. Ross (1872–1875)
- Charles Thompson (1875–1879)
- Dennis Bushyhead (1879–1887)
- Joel B. Mayes (1887–1891)
- C. J. Harris (1891–1895)
- Samuel Houston Mayes (1895–1899)
- Thomas Buffington (1899–1903)
- William Charles Rogers (1903–1905); deposed by the council
- Frank J. Boudinot (1905–1906); also president of the Keetoowah Nighthawk Society
- William Charles Rogers (1906)

== Cherokee Nation (1975–present) ==
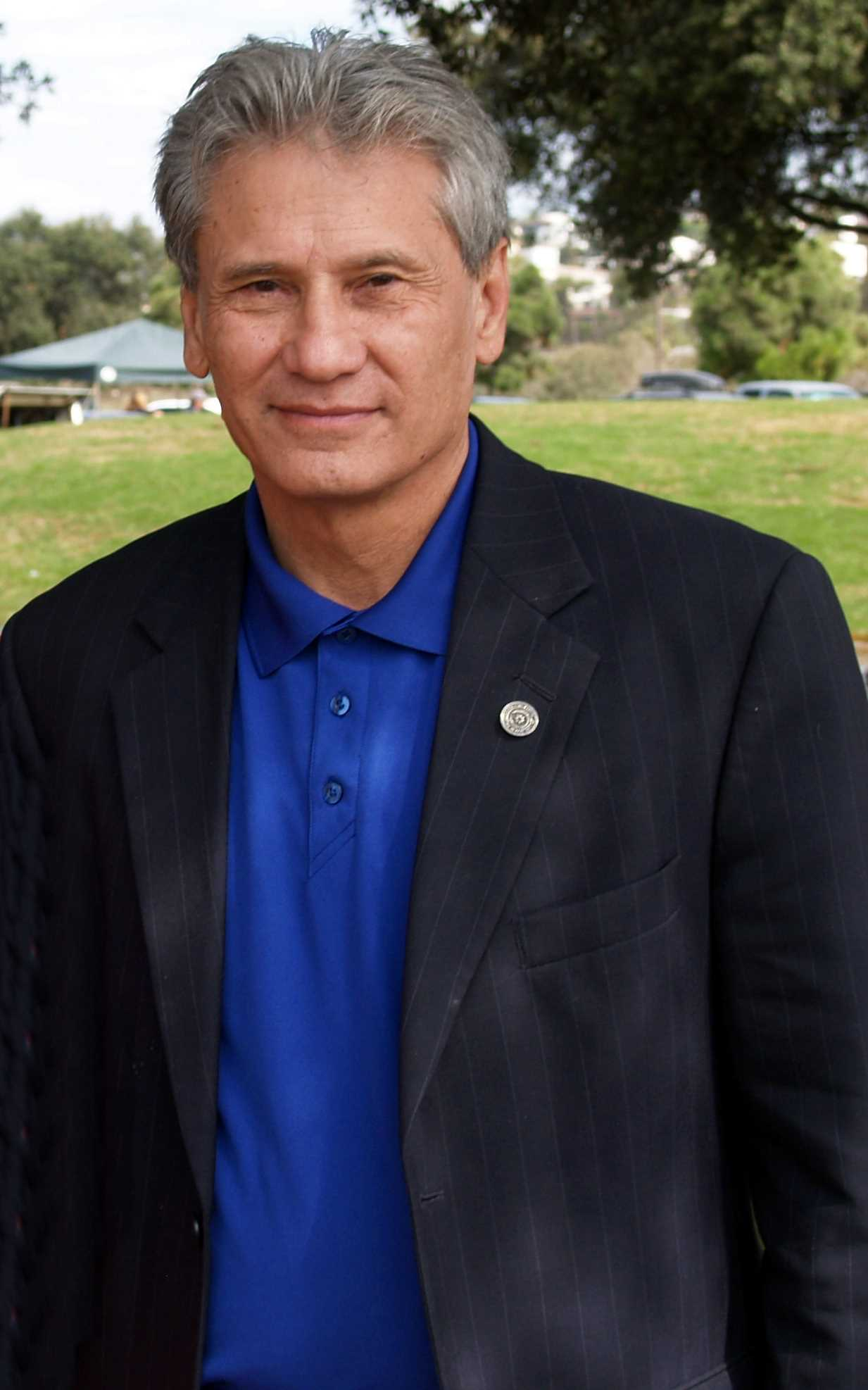
Chad "Corntassel" Smith, former Principal Chief (1999–2011)

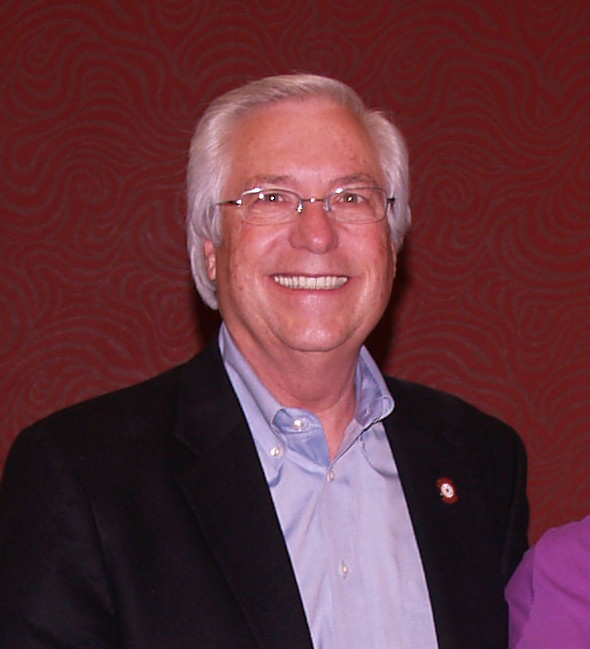
Bill John Baker, Principal Chief of the Cherokee Nation, at the Cherokee Leaders Conference in 2013

In preparation for Oklahoma statehood, the original Cherokee Nation's governmental authority was dismantled by the United States in 1906, except for limited authority to deal with land issues until 1914. The Principal Chief was appointed by the US federal government. In 1971 an election was held. Principal Chief and incumbent, W.W. Keeler, who had been appointed by President Harry Truman in 1949, was elected.

The constitution of the Cherokee Nation of Oklahoma was drafted in 1975 and ratified on June 26, 1976. A new constitution was ratified in 2003 with the name of the tribe changed to simply "Cherokee Nation".

=== Appointed ===
Appointed "Principal Chiefs", many holding the title to serve for a single day, signed documents and performed other pro forma duties as required by the federal government.

- William C. Rogers (1907–1917)

With the admission of Oklahoma to the Union as the forty-sixth state and to extinguish land claims and terminate any unfinished business of the tribe, an Act of April 26, 1906 (34 Statutes at Large, 148) continued the tribal governments, and retained the principal chiefs and governors then in office. Under provisions of this act, Rogers continued in office to sign the deeds transferring the lands of the Cherokee Nation to the individual allottees. Upon his death on November 8, 1917, the President of the United States was authorized by this act to appoint Rogers' successor.

- Andrew B. Cunningham (1917–1928)
- Charles J. Hunt (December 27, 1928)
- Oliver P. Brewer (May 26, 1931)
- William Wirt Hastings (January 22, 1936)
- J.B. Milam (1941–1949)
- W. W. Keeler (1949–1971)

=== Elected ===
- W. W. Keeler (1971–1975)
- Ross Swimmer (1975–1985)
- Wilma Mankiller (1985–1995)
- Joe Byrd (1995–1999)
- Chad "Corntassel" Smith (1999–2011)
- Joe Crittenden (acting, 2011)
- Bill John Baker (2011–2019)
- Chuck Hoskin Jr. (2019–present)

== United Keetoowah Band of Cherokee Indians (1939–present) ==
The UKB Cherokee are descendants primarily of Old Settlers who organized under the federal Indian Reorganization Act of 1934 and the state Oklahoma Indian Welfare Act of 1936. They ratified their constitution and bylaws and were recognized by the federal government in 1950.

- John Hitcher (1939–1946)
- Jim Pickup (1946–1954)
- Jeff Tindle (1954–1960)
- Jim Pickup (1960–1967)
- William Glory (1967–1979)
- James L. Gordon (1979–1983)
- John Hair (1983–1991)
- John Ross (1991–1995)
- Jim Henson (1996–2000)
- Dallas Proctor (2000–2004)
- George Wickliffe (2005–2016)
- Joe Bunch (2016–2024)
- Jeff Wacoche (2024–present)

== See also ==
- List of Native American politicians
- Junaluska
- Traditional Native American Indian titles

== Bibliography ==
- Brown, John P. Old Frontiers. Kingsport: Southern Publishers, 1938.
- Conley, Robert J. The Cherokee Nation: A History. Albuquerque: University of New Mexico Press, 2008.
- Conley, Robert J. A Cherokee Encyclopedia. Albuquerque: University of New Mexico Press, 2007. ISBN 978-0826339515.
- Hoig, Stanley. The Cherokees and Their Chiefs: In the Wake of Empire. Fayetteville: University of Arkansas Press, 1998.
- McLoughlin, William G. Cherokee Renascence in the New Republic. Princeton: Princeton University Press, 1992.
- Mooney, James. Myths of the Cherokee and Sacred Formulas of the Cherokee (1900). Reprint: Nashville: Charles and Randy Elder-Booksellers, 1982.
- Moore, John Trotwood and Austin P. Foster. Tennessee, The Volunteer State, 1769–1923, Vol. 1. Chicago: S. J. Clarke Publishing Co., 1923.
- Morand, Anne, Kevin Smith, Daniel C. Swan, Sarah Erwin. Treasures of Gilcrease: Selections from the Permanent Collection. Norman: University of Oklahoma Press, 2005. ISBN 978-0806199566.
- Timberlake, Henry and Duane King. The Memoirs of Lt. Henry Timberlake: The Story of a Soldier, Adventurer, and Emissary to the Cherokees, 1756–1765. University of North Carolina Press, 2007. ISBN 978-0807831267.
- Wilkins, Thurman. Cherokee Tragedy: The Ridge Family and the Decimation of a People. New York: Macmillan Company, 1970.
