= John Brown (Cherokee chief) =

Principal Chief of the Cherokee Nation West

John Brown, formerly judge of the Chickamauga District of the Cherokee Nation East, was elected Principal Chief of the Cherokee Nation West 22 April 1839, after the Old Settlers decided to elect new officers to strengthen their position vis-a-vis the Latecomers under John Ross, in place of then Principal Chief John Looney. He served until a majority of the Old Settlers decided his administration had not gone far enough to accomplish a compromise with the Ross party, and re-elected his predecessor John Looney in his place that July.

Brown's Tavern in Lookout Valley, Chattanooga, Tennessee, is so-named because it was once his, part of a complex of businesses that included a riverboat landing for the tavern and inn, Brown's Ferry a mile or more downstream, a large farm, and a mill. Now a private home, it is on the National Register of Historic Places.

== Sources ==
- McLoughlin, William G. Cherokee Renascence in the New Republic. (Princeton: Princeton University Press, 1992).
- Wilkins, Thurman. Cherokee Tragedy: The Ridge Family and the Decimation of a People. (New York: Macmillan Company, 1970).

Preceded by John Looney	Principal Chief of the Cherokee Nation West; 1839	Succeeded by John Looney
