= Mary Ross =

Mary Ross or Rosse may refer to:

- Mary Ross (shipbuilder) (?–1847), English shipbuilder
- Mary Golda Ross (1908–2008), Native American female engineer
- Mary Jane Ross (1827–1908), Cherokee writer
- Mary Leslie, Countess of Ross
- Mary Ross, character in "The Toys of Caliban"
- Mary Ross, character in The Airmail Mystery
- Mary Ross Banks (1846–1910), née Ross, American writer
- Mary Ross Ellingson (1906–1993), née Ross, Canadian archaeologist

== See also ==
- Mary Rosse (1813–1885), Anglo-Irish amateur astronomer, architect, furniture designer, and pioneering photographer
