= J. B. Milam =

Principal Chief of the Cherokee Nation from 1941 to 1949

Jesse Bartley Milam (1884–1949) was best known as the first Principal Chief of the Cherokee Nation appointed by a U.S. president since tribal government had been dissolved before Oklahoma Statehood in 1907. He was appointed by President Franklin D. Roosevelt in 1941, who reappointed him in 1942 and 1943; he was reappointed by President Harry S. Truman in 1948. He died while in office in 1949.

== Early life ==
J. B. Milam, as he was commonly known, was born on March 10, 1884, near Italy, Texas, to Sarah Ellen (née Couch) and William Guinn Milam. His mother's family had fled the Cherokee Nation in Indian Territory to Texas in 1863 as refugees from the fighting during the American Civil War. His father's family had immigrated to Texas from Alabama. He was Cherokee through his mother, who was a member of the Long Hair Clan. According to the Cherokee matrilineal kinship system, he was considered born into her clan, receiving his social status from her people. In 1887 his family returned to Cherokee Nation lands in northeastern Indian Territory and settled near what is now Chelsea, Oklahoma.

Milam attended the Cherokee Male Seminary, a tribally run college in Tahlequah, Oklahoma. In 1901 and 1902, he studied at the Metropolitan Business College in Dallas, Texas. After college, he returned to Chelsea and worked in his father's hardware store. He also worked as a cashier at the Bank of Chelsea. He also ventured into the burgeoning oil and gas business. Together with his brother-in-law, Woodley G. Phillips, Milam founded the Phillips and Milam Oil Company, which grew rapidly.

On April 6, 1904, he married Elizabeth Peach McSpadden. Her Cherokee Dawes Roll number was #12943, while his was #24953. These numbers are from the census rolls of Cherokee citizens from 1899 to 1907 documented by the US federal government's Dawes Commission to allot tribal lands. The couple had two daughters and one son.

In 1915, Milam became the president of the Bank of Chelsea, the first bank in the Cherokee Nation. He later founded the Rogers County Bank in Claremore, Oklahoma.

== Fostering cultural studies ==
In 1922, Milam privately funded Emmet Starr's research of Cherokee genealogy and history, which resulted in the 1917 publication of Starr's Early History of the Cherokees. Milam, an avid bibliophile, amassed a collection of over 1600 volumes about Cherokee and Native American history and culture.

Inspired by the inventor of the Cherokee syllabary, Sequoyah and his quest to unite Cherokee factions, J. B. Milam funded an expedition to Mexico to find Sequoyah's gravesite. Cherokee and non-Cherokee scholars drove from Oklahoma to Eagle Pass, Texas, in January 1939. They discovered what they believed to be his grave near a spring in the Mexican state of Coahuila; however, they could not conclusively prove the grave belonged to Sequoyah.

== Tribal government ==
The Cherokee Nation's tribal government had been dismantled by the US Federal government under the Curtis Act of 1898, an amendment to the Dawes Act that applied to the Five Civilized Tribes in Indian Territory in allotting communal tribal lands to households of members of the tribes. It also dissolved tribal governments.

The Indian Reorganization Act (IRA) was introduced in 1934 to enable tribes to develop unicameral governments. Opposition to the IRA led to the creation of the Oklahoma Indian Welfare Act of 1936, specifically to restore tribal governments within Oklahoma. However, the Cherokee Nation did not reorganize their government under these acts due to the restrictions on governmental structure dictated by the acts. Principal Chief Wilma Mankiller writes also that the Cherokee did not want to follow this model because of the difficulties related to "our historical relationship with the United States and our belief in our inherent sovereignty as a nation."

== Role as Principal Chief ==
During the 1920s and 1930s, the Office of the President appointed chiefs to Native American tribes. Cherokee citizens objected to not being able to choose their own leaders. On August 8, 1938, in Fairfield, Oklahoma, a grassroots National Council of Cherokees gathered to choose their own Chief. They elected J. B. Milam. On April 16, 1941 Franklin D. Roosevelt confirmed J.B. Milam's appointment as chief. Roosevelt, and later Harry S Truman, reconfirmed his appointment in 1942, 1943, and 1947. Milam served as chief until his death.

As chief, Milam wanted first and foremost to reconstruct the tribal government and renew tribal claims against the US federal government. He also sought to repatriate culturally and historically significant items to the tribe. To this end, he worked with representatives of the University of Oklahoma, Northeastern State University, and the Carnegie Library of Tahlequah. He placed repatriated items in the care of the Oklahoma Historical Society.

Milam helped create several Cherokee language classes and was instrumental in creating the Cherokee National Historical Society. He started negotiations for the tribe to purchase the site of the original Cherokee National Female Seminary, the tribal college in Park Hill, Oklahoma, that had burned down in 1887.

In the interest of intertribal treaty rights, Milam was one of the founding members of the National Congress of American Indians. He participated in their first meeting in Denver, Colorado, in 1944.

Shortly afterward, he established elections for a Cherokee tribal council, with an eye toward rebuilding the Cherokee Nation's democratic government. In 1946, Milam began purchasing land to put into trust as communal land for the Cherokee Nation. In a year's time, he purchased 21,453 acres (86.82 km^{2}) for the tribe.

With the blessing of the Bureau of Indian Affairs, Milam convened a national convention in Tahlequah on July 30, 1948. The convention would pursue Cherokee rights to the Indian Land Claims Commission and elect a Cherokee National assembly. Seven hundred Cherokee men and women participated. Although the goal of the convention was Cherokee unity, it proved fractious. In some participants' views, the convention was dominated by non-Indian attorneys. As a result, the United Keetoowah Society formally expelled J. B. Milam on August 13, 1948. However, the convention did yield some positive results. A standing committee of eleven members was elected, to be led by the Principal Chief. Texas Cherokee were included among those represented.

== Legacy ==
Milam died on May 8, 1949, from heart disease. He is buried in the Chelsea Cemetery.

His daughter, Mildred Elizabeth Milam Viles was active in Cherokee community development, particularly in Cookson, Oklahoma. She maintained and expanded upon J. B. Milam's research library. Her son, Philip Hubbard Viles, grandson of J.B. Milam, served for two decades as Chief Justice of the Cherokee Nation.

J. B. Milam's papers are archived at the McFarlin Library at the University of Tulsa. Many of his personal effects and items connected to his membership to the Freemasons and Shriners are in the collections of the Cherokee Heritage Center.

Principal Chief Ross Swimmer writes of Milam: "His story is in large part the internal history of the Cherokee Nation as it continued to function and grow despite the policy of the government in Washington. ... Milam's life is a touchstone for the history of Indian-White relations."

== Notes ==
| Preceded by William Rogers | Principal Chief of the Cherokee Nation; 1941–1949 | Succeeded by W. W. Keeler |
