= John Looney =

John Looney may refer to:

- J. Thomas Looney (1870–1944), originator of the Oxfordian theory regarding the authorship of Shakespeare's plays
- John Patrick Looney (1865–1947), gangster in Rock Island, Illinois during the early 1900s
- John Looney (Cherokee chief) (died 1846)

== See also ==
- John Don Looney (1916–2015), end in the National Football League
