= Whitepath =

Cherokee leader

Nunnahitsunega, or "Whitepath", was a full-blood traditionalist leader and member of the Cherokee National Council who lived at Turnip Town (Ulunyi), near the large Ellijay (Elatseyi) in the early 19th century. In 1824, influenced by the teachings of the Seneca prophet Handsome Lake, he began a rebellion against the acculturation then taking place in the Cherokee Nation, proposing the rejection of Christianity and the new constitution, and a return to the old tribal laws. He soon had a large following, whom his detractors referred to as "Red Sticks", and they formed their own council, electing Big Tiger as their principal chief.

The more progressive leaders on the national council—such as Pathkiller, Charles R. Hicks, Major Ridge, and John Ross—deposed him from his seat in 1826, but when he submitted to their authority in 1828, he was returned to his seat.

Whitepath died in November 1838 on the Latham farm outside of Hopkinsville, Kentucky where the detachment was camped during the Cherokee removal. Unable to be buried in the town cemetery, the Latham family allowed him to be buried in their family cemetery. That cemetery is now a part of the Trail of Tears National Trail Commemorative Park in Hopkinsville and is open to the public.

Whitepath is a character in Unto These Hills, an outdoor drama that has been performed in Cherokee, NC since 1950. He is currently played by Joshua Driver in the 2024 season.

== Sources ==
- Brown, John P. Old Frontiers: The Story of the Cherokee Indians from Earliest Times to the Date of Their Removal to the West, 1838. (Kingsport: Southern Publishers, 1938).
- McLoughlin, William G. Cherokee Renascence in the New Republic. (Princeton: Princeton University Press, 1992).
- Mooney, James. Myths of the Cherokee and Sacred Formulas of the Cherokee. (Nashville: Charles and Randy Elder-Booksellers, 1982).
