= John Leak Springston =

John Leak Springston, circa: 1870

John Leak Springston "Oo ne qua ti" ᎤᏁᏆᏘ (1844–1929), a Cherokee, is best known as an Indian activist; during his life he was a Cherokee Interpreter, Editor, Lawyer, and Keetoowah Revivalist. Springston was born in the fall of 1844 in Indian Territory near Lynch's Mill, five miles east of the present site of Spavinaw Dam in the state of Oklahoma. He was the son of Anderson Springston and Sallie Eliot, Cherokees who walked the Trail of Tears from Gunter's Landing, Alabama on the Tennessee River, some 600 miles to Indian Territory. After removal, Anderson practiced law in the Cherokee courts of the Delaware and Tahlequah Districts. As a young boy, John received instruction in tribal law and Cherokee culture at his father’s side.

Young Springston, who attended school in the Delaware District, was a native Cherokee speaker, and did not learn English until age seven. An eloquent speaker and writer, he was employed as a clerk and court reporter in the Saline District by the age of fifteen and planned to pursue a law degree at Shurtleff College in Alton, Illinois. Before he could realize his goals, however, Indian Territory became embroiled in the Civil War, and response, he volunteered for service in the Union Army. As a member of the Third Regiment, Company I, Indian Home Guards under the leadership of Colonel William A. Phillips and the command of Captain Whitecatcher, he spent his entire tour of duty in and around the Spavinaw vicinity. With Company I, he engaged in two major battles in the region, at Cabin Creek near Vinita and at Honey Springs near Muskogee, yet because of his significant bilingual skills and legal experience, his superiors assigned him to the post of Acting Interpreter at Fort Gibson.

In the postwar years, Springston accepted employment as a translator and associate editor of the weekly Cherokee Advocate, published at Tahlequah. In this capacity, he worked as an associate of William P. Boudinot, William P. Ross, and other prominent Cherokees whose influence did much to shape his developing political ideology. His editorial and linguistic capabilities soon attracted the attention of Cherokee tribal officials who offered him the position of Secretary to the Principal Chief and official Executive Translator. His new post afforded him special access to all transactions between the Cherokee Nation and the federal government, and helped to expand his knowledge about the inner workings of government.

In 1867, Springston married Sarah Eliza Moseley, a Cherokee, with whom he had two daughters, Ruth and Elizabeth, however, Moseley became ill and died in 1872. In 1874, he married a second wife, Amanda Williams, in Tahlequah. His second marriage produced two more daughters, Viola and Wenona. Williams died in 1882. In 1886, he married a third time, to Alice Caroline Gray of North Carolina, with whom he had his only son, William. P. Boudinot Springston.

With his traditional upbringing, Springston favored the views of those who contested federal intervention in Indian Territory. He shared their perceptions of a reinvigorated, autonomous, and independent Cherokee Nation, and worked tirelessly toward those goals for the rest of his life. He was also a staunch abolitionist. Growing increasingly agitated over the large numbers of interlopers, imposters, and frauds that had been steadily pouring into the Cherokee Nation in search of a fast dollar in the reconstruction era, he supported a revitalization of the ancient Keetoowah Society. This nativist movement that opposed slavery and non-Cherokee interference in tribal matters. Between 1880 and 1890, this secret society was so powerful in Indian Territory, that it was able to dictate who held positions of authority within the Nation. During this period, Springston served as sheriff of the Saline District, as clerk of the Cherokee senate, and authored several volumes on Cherokee laws and treaties in both Syllabary and English.

He retired from the Advocate staff in 1886; however, he continued his interest in newspaper work by assuming editorship of the Tahlequah Morning Sun. Two years later, he accepted an important appointment as interpreter in the United States court at Fort Smith, presided over by Judge Isaac C. Parker, the infamous "Hanging Judge of Indian Territory." Parker’s court had exclusive jurisdiction over criminal matters in Indian Territory.

Springston also acted as clerk of the senate and official interpreter throughout the administration of Chief Dennis Bushyhead, 1879 - 1887. Until his retirement in 1925, he continued to practice law. He devoted a great deal of his time to pursuing pension claims for Indian veterans of the Civil War and the Spanish–American War.

For some years, the Springston family made their home in Sallisaw where John constructed a large home near the Kansas City Southern Railroad station. This home, known as the Springston House, later housed the first public school in Sallisaw.

After his third marriage, Springston moved to Vian, where he became one of the principal founders of that town. He spent his declining years with his son in Tulsa, where he died in 1929 at the age of eighty-four years. William. P. Boudinot Springston, his son, donated Springston's important papers to the Oklahoma Historical Society, the Gilcrease Museum, and University of Oklahoma’s Western History Collections for preservation.
