= Evan Jones (missionary) =

Welsh Baptist missionary

- Born: 1788; Wales
- Died: August 18, 1872 (aged 83–84); Talequah, Cherokee Nation, Indian Territory
- Other names: Cherokee: ᎦᏬᎯᎶᏍᎩ, romanized: Gawohilosgi
- Occupations: Draper, Missionary
- Years active: 1821-1870

Evan Jones (1788–1872) was born in Wales, where he worked as a draper and followed the Methodist religion. He married Elizabeth Lanigan and emigrated to the United States in 1821, arriving at Philadelphia. Jones became a Baptist missionary and spent over fifty years as a missionary to the Cherokee people. The Baptist Foreign Mission Board initially sent him and his family to work among the Cherokees living in North Carolina, where he learned to speak and write in the Cherokee language, taught school at the Valley Town Baptist Mission, and became an itinerant preacher. Jones volunteered to lead one group of Cherokees to Indian Territory, when they were expelled from their ancestral homeland by the U.S. government. When they finally arrived, he reestablished the Baptist Mission and school and resumed his missionary activities. With the help of his son, John Buttrick Jones, he continued his work preaching, translating religious books, and serving as an advocate for the Cherokees. One author claims that Evan and his son "...converted more American Indians to Christianity than any other Protestant missionaries in America".

== Life in North Carolina ==
Jones had been an adherent of Methodism in Wales, but converted to the Baptist church soon after he arrived in Philadelphia. He became a Baptist missionary and was sent to Valley Town, North Carolina, where he taught at the Baptist mission school. Among his pupils were the future Cherokee missionary, Jesse Bushyhead and a future chief of the Cherokee tribe, Lewis Downing. Jones' wife died at Valley Town on February 5, 1831. Their son, John Buttrick Jones, was born December 24, 1824. He also had a daughter, Mary Lincoln Jones, who was born in 1835 in the Eastern Cherokee Nation, North Carolina.

Evan married Pauline Cunningham after Elizabeth's death. According to the Encyclopedia of Oklahoma, Jones was accused of committing adultery with her. He was also accused of murdering his sister-in-law, Cynthia Cunningham, and her baby, thus granting him the dubious distinction of being the first clergyman to be tried for murder in the United States. He was tried by a civil court and a church council and was acquitted in both.

Jones soon found that many of the older Cherokees, especially those who lived in the mountains, clung tenaciously to their old ways and culture. He wrote in his journal that people he called "conjurers" (actually, they were the adoniskee or medicine men) would spread rumors that the Europeans had furnished the Bible to lead the Cherokees astray from their old religion. They collected the prayer books and hymnals that Jones had given out and returned them to the mission. Sometimes they even threatened Jones with bodily harm. Jones persisted and, over time, these same people came to develop a tolerance for him and his work, while he exhibited a tolerance for their old ways. Jones and Bushyhead developed a close working relationship as missionaries, with Jones often preaching in English and Bushyhead translating the sermon into Cherokee. In 1832, Reverend Jones recommended to the Baptist Board of Foreign Missions that Bushyhead be appointed as an assistant missionary. The appointment was made, and Bushyhead served in this role for the next eleven years. He is said to have been the first Cherokee to have been ordained as a Baptist minister. He continued to work closely with Jones, not only preaching to the Cherokees, but translating the Book of Genesis and other religious books into the Cherokee language, using the Cherokee Syllabary.

== Cherokee removal ==
Jones vehemently opposed the removal of the Cherokees from their ancestral lands in the Southeastern United States to the Indian Territory. Unable to prevent their expulsion, he volunteered to lead one group of the tribe on the Trail of Tears. His group comprised 1,033 people, who left Valley Town on February 2, 1838, just ahead of another group led by Jesse Bushyhead. Jones' group experienced 71 deaths and five births en route. After their arrival in Indian Territory, Jones set about reconstituting the Baptist Mission school near the present town of Westville, Oklahoma. Jones named the site Pleasant Hill. The Cherokees called it "Breadtown", because the Army issued food rations there after the trek.

== Life in Indian Territory ==
Jesse Bushyhead died in 1844, but Evan Jones kept the Pleasant Hill mission going until the Civil War. John Buttrick Jones joined his father in this work in 1855. John had graduated from the University of Rochester and married there earlier that year. The mission had acquired a printing press and the Joneses began publishing a monthly newspaper called the Cherokee Messenger. The paper was printed partly in Cherokee and partly in English. In 1856, the Joneses helped organize a secret anti-slavery organization, the Keetoowah Society, among the full-blood Cherokees, to counter the influence of a secret pro-slavery group. The members vowed to elect anti-slavery candidates to tribal office and to keep the Cherokee Nation neutral in case war broke out between the American states over the slavery issue. Although their meetings were held in the woods with traditional dances and debates, they always opened with prayers by Cherokee Baptist preachers. The pro-slavery faction on the Cherokee Council tried to pass a law in 1857, threatening missionaries with expulsion from the Cherokee Nation if they opposed slavery. The law did not pass, but the full-bloods' anger against the pro-slavery mixed bloods only grew. Evan Jones faced new competition when the Southern Baptist Convention began sending pro-slavery missionaries into the Nation in 1857.

When the Indian Agent Butler learned about the Keetoowah Society, he informed Alfred B. Greenwood, commissioner of Indian Affairs. Greenwood ordered that the Society be broken up and its leaders arrested. This order never succeeded. In 1861, the U.S. Indian Agent forced John B. Evans to leave the territory, claiming that he was "an intemperate abolitionist". The younger Jones spent the Civil War in Illinois. A year later, Evan Jones also fled from pro-slavery vigilantes who threatened his life.

Evan and John Jones both returned to the Cherokee Nation shortly after the Civil War ended. They, like those of other denominations, began to work rebuilding their churches, reactivating former members and recruiting new members. Although they were instructed not to interfere in tribal politics, Evan became a supporter of Lewis Downing, who many full-bloods wanted as Principal Chief, instead of William P. Ross, who had been appointed by the Council.

John B. Jones moved the mission to Tahlequah, which had become the Cherokee capital, in 1867.

== Death and legacy ==
Evan Jones retired from all mission work in 1870. He died August 18, 1872. Pauline died September 17, 1876. Both are buried in Tahlequah, Oklahoma.

The American Baptist Magazine memorialized Evan Jones, saying:

He was a man of scholarly attainments and acquired the Cherokee language and spoke and wrote it freely. The confidence in which he was held among the Cherokees who venerated him as a father, was never impaired. Even in the hours of his last illness, they came from far and near to hear a few last words of comfort in their native tongue from their revered friend. For the last three years he resided at Chetopa, Kansas, at the home of a daughter, and was on a visit to his son at Tahlequah at the time of his death. He was sick only a few days. The previous Sabbath he attended church and heard his son preach.

== Sources ==
- McLoughlin, William G. After the Trail of Tears: The Cherokees' Struggle for Sovereignty. 1993. University of North Carolina Press, Chapel Hill. ISBN 978-0-8078-4433-5.
- McLoughlin, William Gerald. The Cherokees and Christianity: 1794-1870: Essays on Acculturation and Cultural Persistence. (1994) ISBN 0-8203-3138-4. Available on Google Books. Retrieved July 26, 2013.
- Minges, Patrick Neal, Slavery in the Cherokee Nation: The Keetoowah Society and the Defining of a People. 1855-1867. (2003). Taylor & Francis Group. New York. ISBN 0-203-60413-X (Adobe eReader Format). Available on Google Books. Retrieved July 26, 2013.
