= George Wickliffe =

Cherokee politician

United Keetoowah Band of Cherokee Indians Principal Chief
- In office 2005–2016
- Preceded by: Dallas Proctor
- Succeeded by: Joe Bunch

Personal details
- Born: August 10, 1937 Kenwood, Oklahoma, United States
- Died: December 19, 2017 (aged 80) Muskogee, Oklahoma, United States

George Wickliffe (August 10, 1937 - December 19, 2017) was a Cherokee politician who served as the Principal Chief of the United Keetoowah Band of Cherokee Indians from 2005 until 2016.

== Early life ==
Wickliffe was born in Kenwood, Oklahoma, on August 10, 1937. He was the son of Ben Wickliffe and Rosa Blevins Wickliffe. He was a fluent speaker of the Cherokee language. He attended Sequoyah Indian School in Tahlequah, Oklahoma. On his graduation day, May 28, 1957, he married his classmate, Maxine Griffin. Following high school, Wickliffe faithfully served in the United States Army.

After his military service, he pursued higher education. Wickliffe attended Oklahoma Military Academy (now named Rogers State University) in Claremore, OK, Northeastern State College (now designated as a university) in Tahlequah, OK, Tulsa University in Tulsa, OK, and Pittsburg State University in Kansas. He held several associate, bachelor's, and master's degrees in fields including education, administration and history, and he additionally studied government and law at the prestigious University of Tulsa College of Law.

== Career ==
With a passion for education and extending opportunity for all, Wickliffe taught in public schools for several years, moving up through school administration positions from Principal to Superintendent at White Oak Schools. He was a successful basketball coach during his time in education, winning many championship games. Wickliffe also served as a driving instructor for his community.

Wickliffe ran for a seat on the Cherokee National Council in 1975 and won. He served one term on the Cherokee National Council from 1975 to 1979. In 1995, he ran unsuccessfully for Principal Chief of the Cherokee Nation. In 2005, he ran successfully for Principal Chief of the United Keetoowah Band and served until 2016 with two more re-elections.

Chief George Wickliffe led the Keetoowah Nation through several major legal accomplishments, including establishing elder assistance, expanding children’s programs, and establishing tribal housing. He expanded the Keetoowah people’s sovereignty through a lengthy legal battle to establish land in trust and the right to self-governance. His work set the stage for major revelations in tribal sovereignty to be established by the nation in the coming years.

In 2016, he was impeached and removed from office. Three charges of impeachment were filed against Wickliffe, accusing financial crimes. However, no accusations were ever proven in any court proceedings.

In addition to serving as Principal Chief, Wickliffe had a long career in education as he simultaneously taught Cherokee language classes. He had four children, one preceding him in death, and 15 grandchildren and great grandchildren.

== Death ==
Wickliffe died in Muskogee, Oklahoma on December 19, 2017, at age 80.

== See also ==
- List of Principal Chiefs of the Cherokee

Preceded by Dallas Proctor	Chief of the United Keetoowah Band of Cherokee Indians; 2005-2016	Succeeded by Joe Bunch
