= Big Tiger =

Principal Chief of the council of a dissident group of Cherokee

Big Tiger was Principal Chief of the council of a dissident group of Cherokee (1824–1828) who followed the teachings of Whitepath (or Nunnahitsunega), a full-blood traditionalist leader and member of the Cherokee National Council who lived at Turnip Town (Ulunyi), on the Large Ellijay (Elatseyi).

== Background ==
Influenced by the teachings of the Seneca prophet Handsome Lake, Whitepath began a rebellion against the acculturation then taking place in the Cherokee Nation, proposing the rejection of Christianity and the new Cherokee national constitution, and a return to the old tribal laws. The "rebellion" ended with the submission of Whitepath to the more progressive members of the Cherokee National Council.

== Sources ==
- Brown, John P. Old Frontiers: The Story of the Cherokee Indians from Earliest Times to the Date of Their Removal to the West, 1838. (Kingsport: Southern Publishers, 1938).
- McLoughlin, William G. Cherokee Renascence in the New Republic; (Princeton: Princeton University Press, 1992).
- Mooney, James. Myths of the Cherokee and Sacred Formulas of the Cherokee; (Nashville: Charles and Randy Elder-Booksellers, 1982).
