= W. W. Keeler =

American engineer, oilman and tribal chief (1908–1987)

William Keeler

Principal Chief of the Cherokee Nation
- In office 1949–1975
- Preceded by: J. B. Milam
- Succeeded by: Ross Swimmer

Personal details
- Born: William Wayne Keeler; April 5, 1908 Dalhart, Texas, U.S.
- Died: August 24, 1987 (aged 79) Bartlesville, Oklahoma, U.S.
- Spouse: Ruby Hamilton
- Education: University of Kansas (BS)

William Wayne Keeler (April 5, 1908 – August 24, 1987) was an American engineer, oilman, and tribal chief. He was the last appointed and first elected Principal Chief of the Cherokee Nation in the 20th century. Educated as a chemical engineer, he worked for Phillips Petroleum Company, where he became chief executive officer at the end of a long career with the company. Throughout his life he also worked in the federal government for the advancement of Indians. President Truman appointed him as Principal Chief of the Cherokee Nation of Oklahoma in 1949. He also served as chairman for the executive committee of the Texas Cherokees and Associate Bands from 1939 until 1972. In 1971, he became the Cherokees' first elected chief since 1903.

Keeler created tribal institutions such as the Cherokee Nation Builders Corporation and a national Cherokee newspaper. He helped establish the Cherokee Foundation and attain $14 million from the federal government over a land dispute. He led the drafting of a new Cherokee constitution in 1975.

== Early life and education ==
Keeler was 1/32 Cherokee by blood. Both of his grandfathers, George B. Keeler and Nelson F. Carr, were white men who had settled in Cherokee territory and married Cherokee women. They were notable for their roles in founding the community that is now Bartlesville, Oklahoma. Carr owned the sawmill and grist mill in town. George Keeler was one of the men involved in drilling the first oil well in what would become the state of Oklahoma.

Keeler's parents were William and Sarah Louisa Carr, both of whom were of Cherokee descent. William was a stockman who had traveled from Bartlesville to the Texas Panhandle in 1908 to buy cattle. Sarah was then expecting her fourth child, but decided to accompany her husband. She delivered their first son in Dalhart. Only two of their children survived to adulthood: Bill and a sister, Blanche. Young Bill attended Bartlesville public schools. During high school and college, he spent his summers working on construction sites for Phillips Petroleum Company. In 1924, Blanche married Kenneth S. "Boots" Adams, who would later become president of Phillips Petroleum Corporation. The couple divorced in 1945.

Keeler was born into the Long Hair Clan of the Cherokee. He moved to Bartlesville, Oklahoma, as a child and lived with his grandmother due to his mother's ill health. She instilled into him "Indian ways" and Cherokee principles of morality. His mother eventually returned and attempted to raise him with white principles and pushed for him to assimilate. The starkly contrasting influences from his mother and grandmother conflicted Keeler in his early life, but he ultimately successfully assimilated into white society. He began working part-time for Phillips Petroleum on various construction sites at age sixteen while still in high school, and continued during the summers while attending college. Keeler graduated from the University of Kansas with a degree in chemical engineering in 1930.

== Career at Phillips Petroleum Company ==
Keeler accepted a full-time engineering position at Phillips' Kansas City, Kansas Refinery even before he graduated. While living there, he met Ruby Lucille Hamilton, who had graduated from the nursing school at Trinity Lutheran Hospital in Kansas City, Missouri. The couple married in Kansas City on September 15, 1933. They remained in Kansas City, where their first two sons were born, until 1939, when he transferred to the Phillips refinery in Borger, Texas as chief chemist. The family moved back to Bartlesville in 1941, where their youngest son was born. During World War II, he supervised the construction of a new refinery Phillips built in Mexico. After the end of the war, he was promoted to manager of Phillips' refining department in Bartlesville.

Keeler was successful in Phillips Petroleum at a time when Indians often faced discrimination in white-owned businesses. After working for nearly half a century with Philips Petroleum, he rose to CEO of the company in 1968 until he was forced to retire in 1973 due to reaching the company's mandatory retirement age. (Note: Keeler reached Phillips' mandatory retirement age in 1973.) His success with Phillips Petroleum made him a contender for a position in the federal government, which took interest in his work. Keeler was quoted as saying "easterners... are aghast" at finding he was Indian due to his success in the oil industry.

== Federal career ==
In 1948, Keeler was selected as vice chairman of the tribe's executive committee. Both the Cherokee National Council and the Oklahoma congressional delegation recommended that President Truman appoint Keeler as Chief in 1949, following the death of the previous principal chief, J. B. Milam. (Note: Milam was the first Cherokee Principal Chief appointed since the tribal governments had been abolished, just before Oklahoma was proclaimed as a state. Milam had established an executive committee to assist him in governing the tribe. Both Indian Commissioner John R. Nichols and the U.S. Government accepted Milam's committee as a legally constituted body.) Keeler continued to build on the Milam model, and would remain in the chief position until 1975, having been reappointed by Presidents Eisenhower, Kennedy, Johnson, and Nixon. During a period from 1945 to 1972, he also served as chairman of the executive committee of the Texas Cherokees and Associate Bands and was involved with getting the 1836 Treaty of Bowles Village brought before the Indian Claims Commission. He resigned that post in 1972. Under President Johnson's Administration, Keeler was appointed as a member of the National Advisory Committee for the War on Poverty Program and was put on the President's Committee on Economic Opportunity. Alaskan Governor Walter Hickel appointed Keeler chairman of a task force to find ways to improve utilization of native labor. Also under President Johnson, the Secretary of the Interior, Stewart Udall, appointed Keeler to head a group to with the focus of reorganizing the Bureau of Indian Affairs.

Keeler's success in the oil industry and work with the federal government coincided with his older, more conservative upbringing. Clyde Warrior, an Indian activist during the 1960, once mockingly described him as "a little brown American."

== Cherokee Nation ==
Some consider Keeler to be the most influential person to the Cherokee nation aside from John Ross, who battled the removal of Indians and fought against the Trail of Tears. He did not promote native sovereignty in the late 1950s. Keeler did not endorse the radical change of the late 1960s and 1970s but instead promoted more conservative changes and equality. He actively supported education and welfare work among his people, stating "Indians should not be entitled to more rights than anybody else, but they should still have all the rights of everyone else." He also advocated hard work of Indians as means to progress stating that "Indians cannot win friends by force and that militancy damages constructive causes." In 1971, Keeler was democratically elected as Chief of the Cherokee Nation—the first democratic election of chief since 1903. Ross Swimmer, who followed Keeler as Chief, stated that Keeler "was the Cherokee tribe. He was the one who established the tribe and he did a lot of it with his own money and energy."

Keeler also promoted and accomplished infrastructure building in the Cherokee nation. The Cherokee Nation owned several office buildings, including the Tribal Business Office, a BIA-leased building, and a building housing education programs. He also created several Cherokee buildings targeted at industry building; such as a garment manufacturing company with Cherokee employees, the Cherokee Nation Builders Corporation (with Cherokee Indian construction crews), and skills training programs to assimilate to the new industrialized world as well as crafts and child care training for women at home. He also established a national Cherokee newspaper and oversaw the Tribal Housing Authority, which offered low-cost housing to Cherokees. Keeler helped establish the Cherokee Foundation and through legal legislation attained $14,789,000 from the federal government over land dispute. He also presided over the drafting of a new Cherokee constitution in 1975 in his final year as chief.

== Death and legacy ==
Keeler was inducted into the Oklahoma Hall of Fame in 1966.

He died in Bartlesville, Oklahoma, on August 24, 1987, after four years of failing health.

The W. W. Keeler Complex in Tahlequah, Oklahoma, is the seat of Cherokee tribal government, and was named in honor of the late chief. The executive and legislative branches are located there.

== Sources ==
- Cobb, Daniel M. (2008). Native Activism in Cold War America. United Press of Kansas.
- Gridley, Marion E. (1972). Contemporary American Indian Leaders. Cornwall Press, Inc. New York.
- House Committee on Interior and Insular Affairs. Disposition of Judgment Funds of the Cherokee Nation or Tribe of Indians of Oklahoma. 87 H.R. 11590. June 19, 1962.
- Ingham, John N. Biographical Dictionary of American Business Leaders. "Adams, Kenneth Stanley." (1983) Greenwood Press. ISBN 0-313-23907-X (v. 1).Available on Google Books.
- Monney, James. (1975). A Historical Sketch of the Cherokee. Aldine Publishing Company, Chicago.
- Wallis, Michael. Oil Man: The Story Of Frank Phillips & The Birth of Phillips Petroleum. (1995) St. Martin's Press. ISBN 0-312-13135-6. Available on Google Books.

Political offices
Preceded by J. B. Milam	Principal Chief of the Cherokee Nation; 1949–1975	Succeeded by Ross Swimmer
