= Lewis Downing =

Chief of the Cherokee Nation (1823-1872)

- ᎷᏫ ᏌᏩᎾᏍᎩ
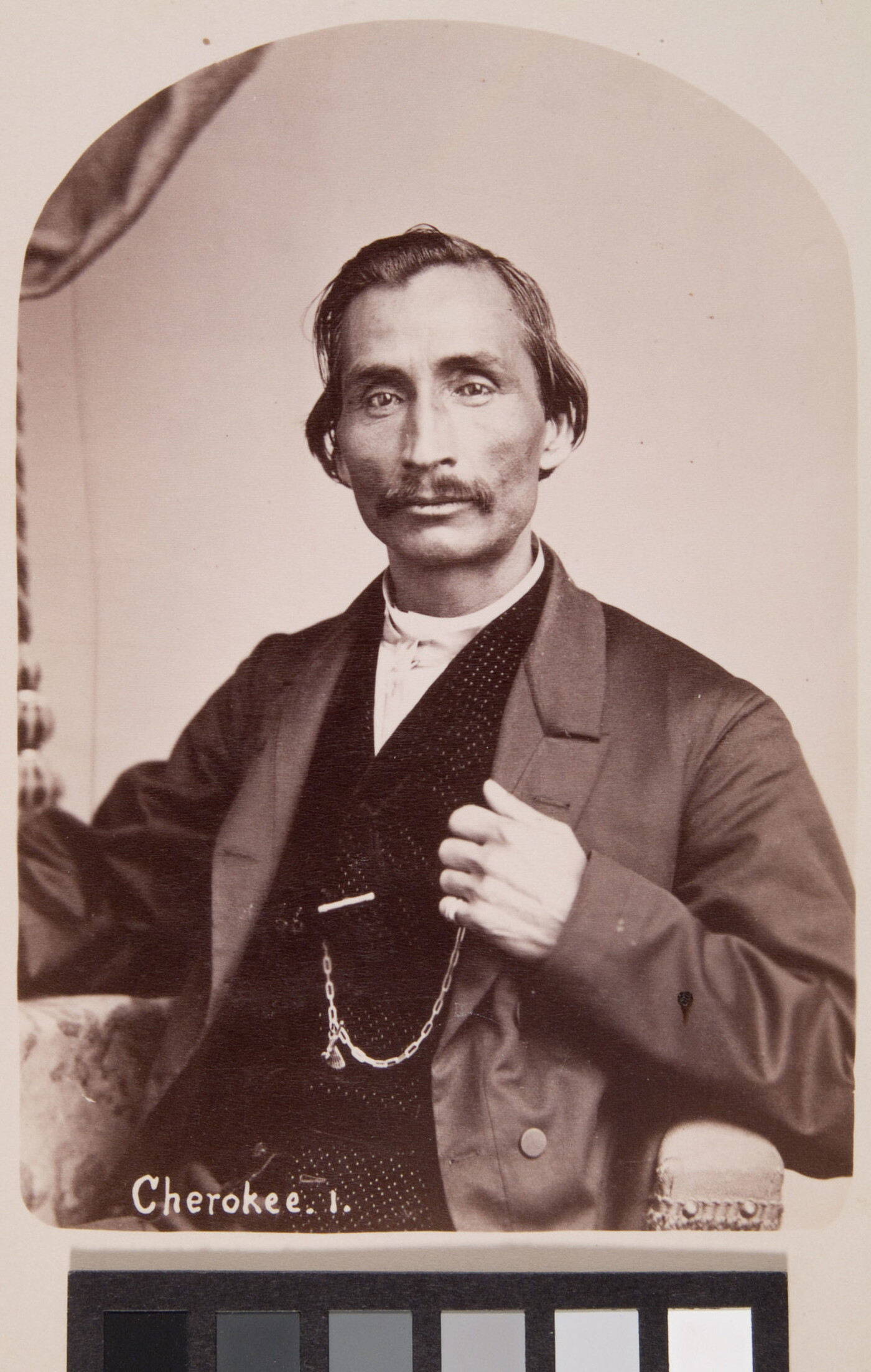

Principal Chief of the Cherokee Nation
- In office August 5, 1867 – November 9, 1872
- Preceded by: William P. Ross
- Succeeded by: William P. Ross
- In office August 1, 1866 – October 19, 1866
- Preceded by: John Ross
- Succeeded by: William P. Ross

Member of the Cherokee Nation Senate
- In office August 1, 1859 – 1861
- In office August 4, 1851 – 1853

Personal details
- Born: 1823 Tennessee, U.S.
- Died: November 9, 1872 Tahlequah, Cherokee Nation, Indian Territory, U. S.
- Party: Downing Party

Lewis Downing (Cherokee: ᎷᏫ ᏌᏩᎾᏍᎩ, romanized: Luwi Sawanasgi or "Lewie-za-wau-na-skie"; c. 1823 – November 9, 1872) served as Chief of the Cherokee Nation from 1867 to 1872. After the death of John Ross, he was elected to a full term as Principal Chief. Downing worked to heal divisions in the tribe following removal to the Indian Territory and the American Civil War. He was elected to a second term in 1871, but died in 1872. The Cherokee Council chose William P. Ross as his successor.

== Background ==
Downing was born in eastern Tennessee in about 1823 to Samuel Downing and his wife Susan Daugherty, who were both Cherokee with mixed European ancestry. The young Downing attended school at the Valley Town Mission in North Carolina. In 1839, Downing and his family went west during the Trail of Tears, the forced removal of the Cherokee people from the southeastern United States. The family was part of the emigration group led by Jesse Bushyhead.

In 1839, the Downings arrived in what is now Adair County, Oklahoma. They settled near the site where Reverend Evan Jones had reorganized the Baptist Mission after its removal from North Carolina. Lewis Downing continued his education at Baptist Mission.

== Career ==
Downing subsequently was ordained as a Baptist minister. On August 3, 1844, he was unanimously chosen pastor of the Flint Baptist Church, succeeding the Reverend Jesse Bushyhead.

The young minister was a strong participant in Cherokee Nation politics and as such was elected senator from Goingsnake District on August 4, 1845. He later removed to a farm on what is today the southeast corner of Mayes County, Oklahoma, where he was elected to the senate on August 4, 1851, and again on August 1, 1859. In 1851, Downing served as a delegate from the Cherokee tribe to Washington, D.C.

== Civil War ==
Lewis Downing was named chaplain of the 1st Cherokee Mounted Rifles, which was formed by Chief Ross for the Confederate Army on October 4, 1861. The members of this regiment were mostly full bloods and were largely not slave owners. The regiment fought in the Confederate service at Pea Ridge, Arkansas, on March 7–8, 1862.

With the advance of the Union forces into the Territory in July 1862, and the departure of Chief Ross for Philadelphia under growing internal tensions, the cavalry's members began to waver in their allegiance to the South. With few exceptions, among them John Drew, the Cherokee began to abandon Confederate service. On July 11, 1862, at Flat Rock Creek, most joined the 3rd Regiment of the Indian Home Guards for service in the Union Army. This contingent was composed of three regiments consisting of 1,480 men, of which Lewis Downing was named Lieut. Colonel and the Rev. John B. Jones was designated its chaplain, in the brigade of Col. William A. Phillips.

Thomas Pegg and Downing would each serve as acting chief of the pro-Union Cherokee in Ross's absence. During their tenure, the nation's legislature passed legislation abolishing slavery and confiscating Confederate property. He also purchased some of the confiscated land and funded anti-Confederate Cherokee guerillas during the war. The pro-Confederate Cherokee were led by Stand Watie, who was elected chief by his soldiers.

== Post war ==
Lewis Downing, as president of the pro-Union tribal council, went to Washington in 1863 to alert the government to the divided situation of the Cherokee.

After the war, a preliminary intertribal peace conference with the United States commissioners was held at Fort Smith on September 8, 1865. At this meeting Downing protested against the refusal of the commissioners to recognize John Ross as the Principal Chief of the Cherokee.

== Becoming chief ==
John Ross died at Washington on August 1, 1866. As Assistant Principal Chief, Lewis Downing succeeded him and served until an election on October 19, 1866. The National Council chose William P. Ross to fill the position of Principal Chief until the next election.

Much bitterness lingered among the Cherokee following the end of the war. Among the Ross faction of the pro-Union Cherokee were many who insisted upon the exclusion of the pro-Confederate Cherokee (called Southern Cherokees) from tribal affairs. Downing opposed discrimination within the tribe and organized the creation of the Downing Party. His party advocated the inclusion of Southern Cherokees and received their support in exchange for nominating "full blood" candidates. Reverend John B. Jones threw his power and influence among the full bloods, behind the Downing movement. The compromise dramatically altered Cherokee politics and allowed for the rehabilitation of former Confederates open to reconciliation as well as the political ostracization of those refused to compromise.

In the tribal election held on August 5, 1867, Lewis Downing was elected Principal Chief with the support of both factions. The Downing party controlled the political affairs of the Cherokee Nation until Statehood in 1908, except for the tenure of chief Dennis W. Bushyhead from 1879 to 1887.

Lewis Downing signed the Treaty of April 27, 1869, at Washington. He represented the Cherokee at Washington as a delegate in 1869 and in 1870. He was re-elected on August 7, 1871.

== Family ==
Downing first married Lydia Price. After Lydia's death, he married Lucinda Griffin. His third marriage was to Mary Eyre, a white widow whom he had met while he was in Washington. Mary moved to Tahlequah while Lewis' previous wife was still alive and married him after her death. Both Lewis and Mary died about two years later.

== Death ==
He died in office at Tahlequah, on November 9, 1872. He died of inflammation of the brain. The Council was required to pick a successor to complete Downing's term. For unknown reasons, they turned to his old opponent, William Potter Ross.

== Works cited ==
- McLoughlin, William G. (1993). After the Trail of Tears: The Cherokees' Struggle for Sovereignty 1839-1880. Chapel Hill: University of North Carolina Press. ISBN 0-8078-2111-X.
- Meserve, John Bartlett (1937). "Chief William Potter Ross" (PDF). Chronicles of Oklahoma. 15 (1): 20–29.
- Meserve, John Bartlett (1938). "Chief Lewis Downing and Chief Charles Thompson (Oochalata.)" (PDF). Chronicles of Oklahoma. 16 (3): 315–325.
- Ramage, Noah (2024). Phoenix on Fire: The Cherokee Nation from Reconstruction to Denationalization (PDF) (PhD thesis). Berkeley, California: University of California Berkeley.

Preceded by William P. Ross	Principal Chief of the Cherokee Nation; 1867-1872	Succeeded by William P. Ross
