= Little Turkey =

Cherokee leader

- Born: c. 1758
- Died: 1801
- Title: First Beloved Man, Principal Chief of the Cherokee Nation
- Predecessor: Hanging Maw
- Successor: Black Fox

Little Turkey (c. 1758–1801) was First Beloved Man of the Cherokee people. In 1794, he became the first Principal Chief of the original Cherokee Nation.

== Headman ==
Little Turkey, born in about 1758, was elected First Beloved Man by the general council of the Cherokee upon their re-establishment of the council's seat at Ustanali on the Conasauga River. This was after the murder of Corntassel in 1788.

The United States recognized his rival, Hanging Maw of Coyatee, as the Cherokees' leading headman. But the larger part of the Cherokee, including the Lower Cherokee who followed Dragging Canoe, recognized Little Turkey as leader.

Following the end of the Cherokee–American wars (1794) and the subsequent organization that year of a national government, Little Turkey's title became Principal Chief of the Cherokee Nation. He held this position until his death in 1801.

Preceded by Corntassel	First Beloved Man; 1788–1794	Succeeded by Title ceased to exist

Preceded by Title nonexistent	Principal Chief of the Cherokee Nation; 1794–1801	Succeeded by Black Fox
