= Hanging Maw =

Leading chief of the Overhill Cherokee

- Uskwa'li-gu'ta
- Died: c. 1794
- Title: First Beloved Man
- Predecessor: Old Tassel
- Successor: Little Turkey

Hanging Maw or Uskwa'li-gu'ta was from 1788 to 1794 the leading chief of the Overhill Cherokee, whose historic settlements were on the western side of the Appalachian Mountains. They were located in present-day southeastern Tennessee. He became chief following the death of Old Tassel, and the abandonment of the traditional capital at Chota after raids by European Americans.

== Early life and education ==
Uskwa'li-gu'ta was born into his mother's family and clan, as the Cherokee had a matrilineal system. Accordingly, his maternal uncle would have taught him men's ways and guided him into the men's societies. He was a descendant of Moytoy III.

== Marriage and family ==
His wife Betsy was the sister of the chief Attakullakulla.

== Adult years ==
Representing his mother's clan, Hanging Maw was on the tribal council for some time. Although Hanging Maw claimed the title of First Beloved Man by right as the chief headman of the Overhill Towns, the rest of the nation had chosen Little Turkey when they moved the seat of the council south to Ustanali on the Conasauga River following the murder of Old Tassel. Uskwa'li-gu'ta was a descendant of Moytoy of Citico. They both exerted power for some time.

Hanging Maw took part in the Cherokee–American wars (1776–1794), including various attacks against settlers in Tennessee and Kentucky, including the capture of Daniel Boone's daughter, Jemima in 1776. In February 1786 in Middle Tennessee, approximately 20 miles southeast of Lafayette, he led a party of 60 men in a skirmish with a surveying party, made up of John and Ephraim Peyton, Squire Grant, and two other white men. Outnumbered, the white men escaped the area, but lost their horses, game, and surveying instruments to the band of Cherokee. The stream at the site of the skirmish became known as "Defeated Creek."

In 1793, a diplomatic party from the Lower Cherokee (as the Cherokee still at war with the United States were by then called) was attacked by colonial militia while traveling to Knoxville, Tennessee, then capital of the Southwest Territory. The militia pursued the Cherokee to Chota on the Little Tennessee River. The town was much reduced since the capital had been moved to Unstanali, near present-day Calhoun, Georgia. When the militia could not capture the diplomatic party, they attacked the people of the town, wounding Hanging Maw and killing his wife Betsy.

The Cherokee retaliated with an invasion of the Holston River settlements. They gathered the largest force of Indians to that point, more than 1,000 warriors from both the Cherokee and the Upper Muskogee, led by John Watts, the chief of the Lower Cherokee. Some warriors killed a European-American family at a small fortified settlement known as Cavett's Station, although Watts had promised them safe passage. The Cherokee became divided over this incident.

Preceded by Old Tassel	First Beloved Man; 1788–1794	Succeeded by Little Turkey
