= Mary Jane Ross =

Native American author (1824–1908)

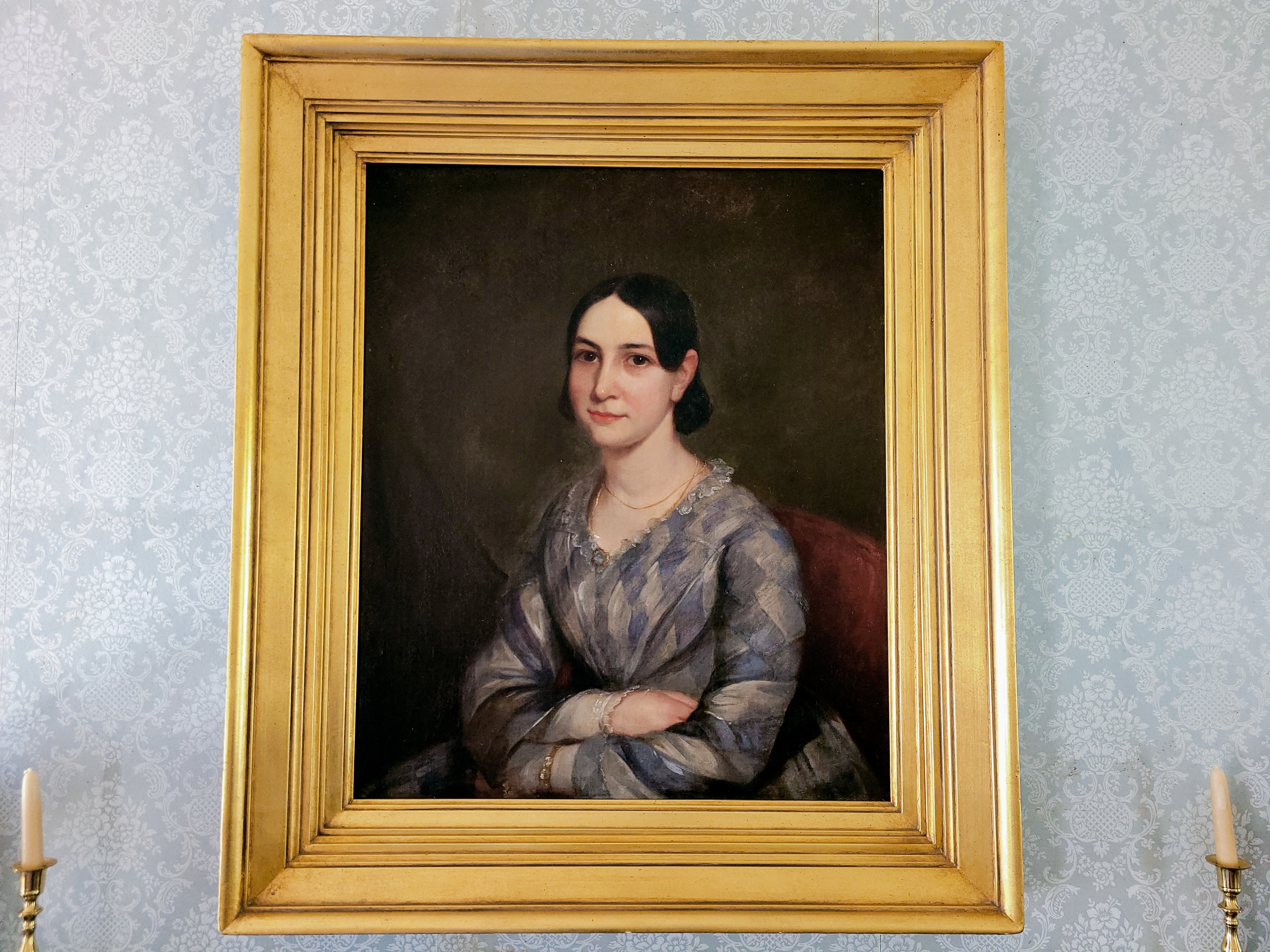
- Portrait of Mary Jane Ross hanging in the West Bedroom of Hunter's Home, Park Hill, Oklahoma
- Born: November 5, 1827; Tennessee, U.S.
- Died: July 29, 1908 (aged 80)
- Resting place: Cherokee National Cemetery, Fort Gibson, Muskogee County, Oklahoma, U.S.
- Citizenship: Cherokee
- Education: Patapsco Female Institute
- Notable work: The Life and Times of Honorable William P. Ross of the Cherokee Nation (1893)
- Spouse: William P. Ross (married 1846)

Mary Jane Ross (November 5, 1827 – Jul 29, 1908) was born in Tennessee to the most prominent Cherokee family of the nineteenth century. The Ross family led the Cherokee Nation through some of its most tumultuous historical events, including the Trail of Tears and the American Civil War. Ross was the daughter of Lewis Ross (1796–1871) and Francis "Fannie" (Holt) Ross (1789–1860). Her paternal uncle John Ross was principal chief of the Cherokee Nation from 1828 until his death in 1866. Her father, Lewis Ross, was a merchant, planter, and Treasurer of the Cherokee Nation. She had the following ten siblings: Minerva A., John McDonald, Araminta, Robert Daniel, Amanda Melvina, Henry Clay, Sarah, Helen, Jack Spears, and Sarah Elizabeth Ross. Born to affluence and a would-be domestic life of leisure, Ross excelled in her studies, was a talented musician, contributed to the support and aid of Cherokee orphans after the Civil War, and endured a life uprooted by the forced removal of the Cherokee people on the Trail of Tears, followed by the hardships of the Civil War. Upon her husband's death, Ross took up the work of authoring and editing large portions of his biography which she submitted for publication to the Library of Congress.

== Education ==
Ross was educated at the Patapsco Female Institute, founded in Ellicott City, Maryland, in 1837. The institute offered a revolutionary higher education curriculum to young women and earned a national reputation for its inclusion of botany, chemistry, and mathematics in a time when it was uncommon for girls to learn math and science. Chief John Ross and Mary Jane's father, Lewis Ross, valued education for Cherokee men and women and believed that educating the Cherokee youth was integral to the longevity and success of the tribe. Ross's brother, Henry C. Ross, was likewise sent away for his education at the Moravian Boarding School, Nazareth, Pennsylvania. Mary Jane would eventually send her son, Willie Ross, to the same school during the Civil War.

== Marriage and family life ==
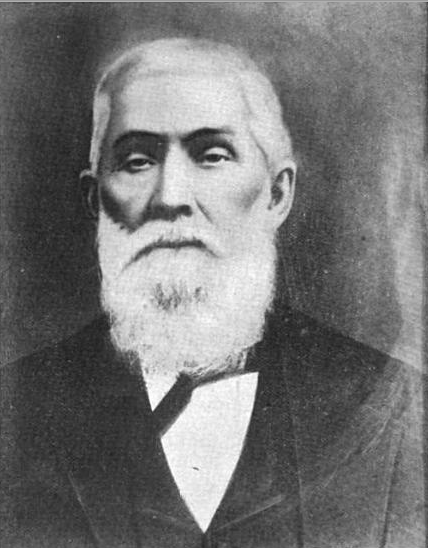
Ross's husband, Chief William Potter Ross.

In 1846, Ross married her first cousin, the future principal Chief of the Cherokee Nation, William Potter Ross. Together, they had nine children. In "The Life and Times of Honorable William P. Ross of the Cherokee Nation", for which Mary was the editor and a contributing author, she writes of their marriage and honeymoon, noting the romance of their honeymoon trip.

He was married in 1846 to Miss Mollie [Mary Jane] Ross by the Rev. John Page, a young Choctaw Methodist preacher. He and his bride then visited Frozen Rock, the refined and romantic home of his relative, Hon. W.S. Coody.

Ross and Hon. William Potter Ross remained married for the rest of their lives. In W.P. Ross' biography, Mary Jane makes a point to highlight how beloved he was to friends, family, and the wider Cherokee Nation. She made the editorial decision to include transcriptions of personal letters of condolence that were sent to her on his passing. These small personal touches stand in contrast to the administrative details of his biography.

== Hunter's Home ==
- Hunter's Home
- U.S. National Register of Historic Places
- U.S. National Historic Landmark
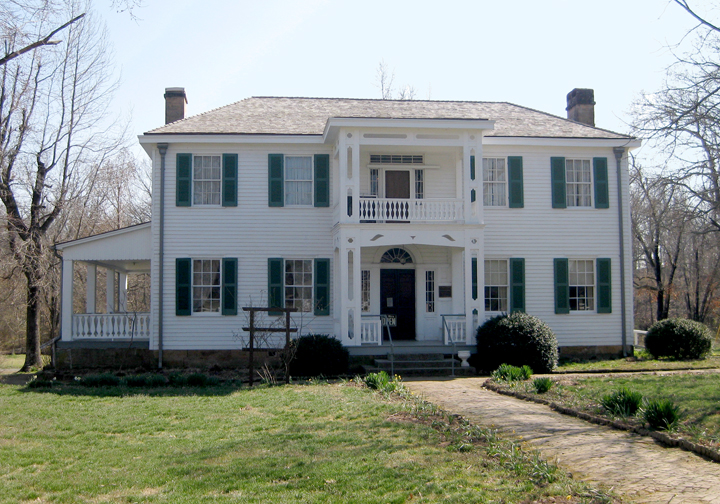
- Hunter's Home

- Location within Oklahoma
- Location: Park Hill, Oklahoma
- Coordinates: 35°51′21″N 94°57′32″W
- Built: 1843–1845
- Architectural style: Federal
- NRHP reference No.: 70000530
- Designated NHL: May 30, 1974

Much of the Ross family history is bound up in the plantation mansion known as the Murrell Home or Hunter's Home in Park Hill, near Tahlequah, Oklahoma in the Cherokee Nation. The home was built between 1843 and 1845 by George M. Murrell, Ross's brother-in-law. It is now the last antebellum plantation remaining in Oklahoma, the rest having been burned or destroyed during the Civil War. The parlor of the Murrell home contains an 1840s piano that belonged to Ross. A portrait of Ross hangs in the center of the West Bedroom where she gave birth to her son, Hubbard Ross (18 Jul, 1867).

During the War, the area surrounding Hunter's Home was frequently raided by forces loyal to both the Union and Confederacy. When war broke out, George M. Murrell and his family left the home and went east where George served in the Confederate Army – likely the reason the Rebel raiders did not burn the home to the ground. Ross hid archives of the Cherokee Nation in the basement walls of the home.

Ross wrote to her friend, Sarah, of the brutality of the war near Park Hill.

For the last seven months the storm of war has howled so fearfully around us, that we have found it hard to compose ourselves sufficiently to write even to our best loved absent friends ... It were vain for me to endeavor to picture to you the terrors and trials we have passed through since last reported several times I kept a daily account of what was passing and then a new alarm would cause me to burn what might fall into the hands of our enemy more than once when our poor boys would venture home-they at a moment's warning would have to rush to the thickets ... The people are starving-and the Small pox has broken out on Caney – Are we doomed to destruction .... Katy and I cook, wash, make fires, work in the garden and even work an old mule in the cart when we get out of wood; Last week we put the children and a few shrubs &c into the cart and went up to our grave yard. I planted a few bulbs and a rose bush around your dead as well as ours.

Ross wrote to her son Willie about the condition of the Murrell home during the Civil War on October 2, 1865.

Your Aunt Mankie's [Amanda's] house and place looks much worn and grown up with weeds. Inside the house, her nice side board was broken, one door split nearly down and all the feathers spilt upon the floors and the ticks [mattresses] taken by Stand Watie's men. They treated Aunt Jane very badly indeed, took all her quilts and blankets – meat, flour, coffee, salt, corn and wheat that your Uncle George and Aunt Mankie gave her.

Ross came to live in the Murrell Home after the war was over with because her nearby home in Fort Gibson was destroyed.

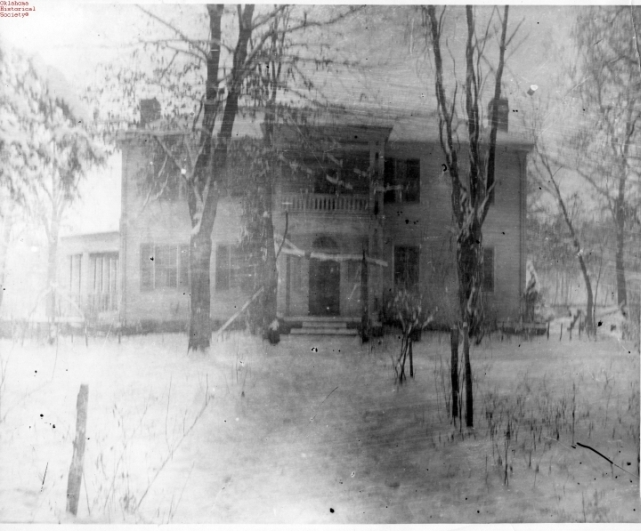
Hunter's Home - Front of the home in winter

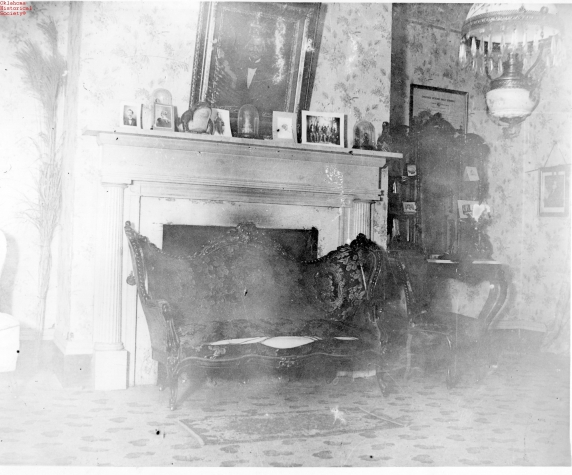
Hunter's Home - Interior view

== Refugee ==
Although Ross's uncle, Chief John Ross, was a Union supporter, he reluctantly signed a treaty of alliance with the Confederacy in September 1861 in an effort to keep the fractured factions of his tribe from splitting further. On July 15, 1862, Union troops came to Park Hill and arrested the Chief for signing the treaty with the Confederacy. Ross's husband was also arrested at this time. Chief John Ross took about thirty-five family members with him out of Oklahoma for the duration of his exile. William Potter Ross, Mary Jane Ross, and their children, Emma and Cora, accompanied the Chief's entourage north. Their son, Willie, remained at school in Pennsylvania. Ross and the girls would refugee in Fort Scott, Kansas. While a refugee in Kansas, Ross wrote to her son, Willie, away at school in Pennsylvania. In August 1863, she wrote a letter expressing her anxieties about the future of the Cherokee Nation after her home in Fort Gibson was burned to the ground.

Where we will find another home I cannot say, but I still intend to go back to the Nation, but whether there will be peace, safety, and pleasure living there for a long time to come is doubtful. At best things will be changed. Many of our friends have been scattered abroad upon the world. Others dead, yet others are estranged one from the other.

Mary Jane and William Potter Ross eventually returned to the Cherokee Nation when Union forces occupied the area.

== Cherokee orphan asylum ==
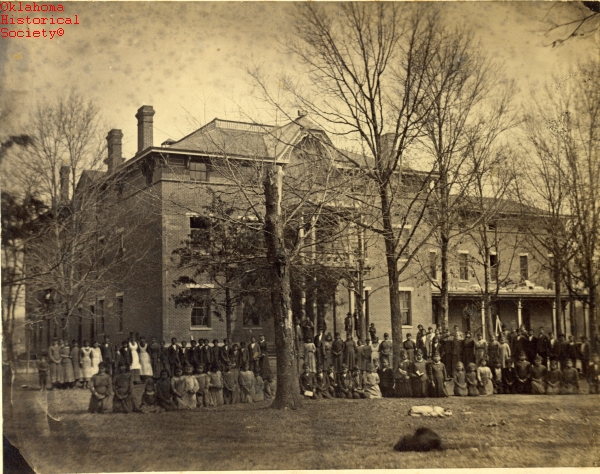
Cherokee Orphan Asylum built in the home of Lewis Ross after his death.

After the Civil War, many Cherokee children found themselves orphaned or with only one living parent who had to travel to find employment. Mary Jane and William Potter Ross engaged in the work of founding an orphan asylum. In 1872, The Cherokee Nation began considering possible locations for an orphanage, including Mary Jane's family home, owned by her father Lewis Ross, who died in 1860. Lewis Ross' home was a large three-story brick house located along the Grand River in the Salina District with the potential for expansion. Chief William P. Ross, as the executor of the Lewis Ross estate, stood to profit from the sale of the properties.

== Bereavement and publication of William. P. Ross biography ==
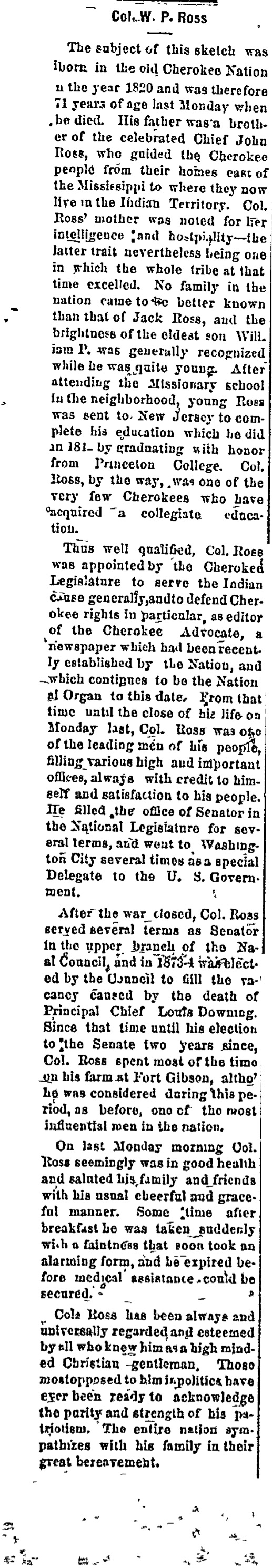
The announcement of Hon. William Potter Ross' death in the Cherokee Advocate newspaper, of which he was the first editor.

Ross's husband, William Potter Ross, died at Fort Gibson on July 20, 1891. He is buried at Fort Gibson's Cherokee National Cemetery. In the two years following his death, Ross took pains to prepare, edit, and publish his biography, "The Life and Times of Honorable William P. Ross of the Cherokee Nation]" (1893). She writes a personal dedication at the beginning of the biography, thanking loved ones for their support.

To his many friends in the Cherokee Nation and elsewhere who have honored him, and to his cousin, Joshua Ross, whose labors we so highly appreciate, is this volume respectfully dedicated by his wife, MRS. WM. P. ROSS.

Rosse received an onslaught of condolence letters and words of kindness in her grief. She chose to publish a selection of these lettering in the biography. Her cousin, Jane Nave, sent a deeply personal letter on the same day of her husband's death, highlighting how important he was to his wife.

Dear Cousin Mollie: The sad, the stunning news, came to me with a shock! Your irreparable loss; your companion and beloved husband taken from you, by the relentless hand of death! and, oh, how my deepest sympathies go out to you and your dear children in your heart-stricken grief and sorrow, sent thro ' the dispensation of an All-Wise Providence, you are bereaved of your best friend and beloved one; your dear children of a fond and affectionate father.

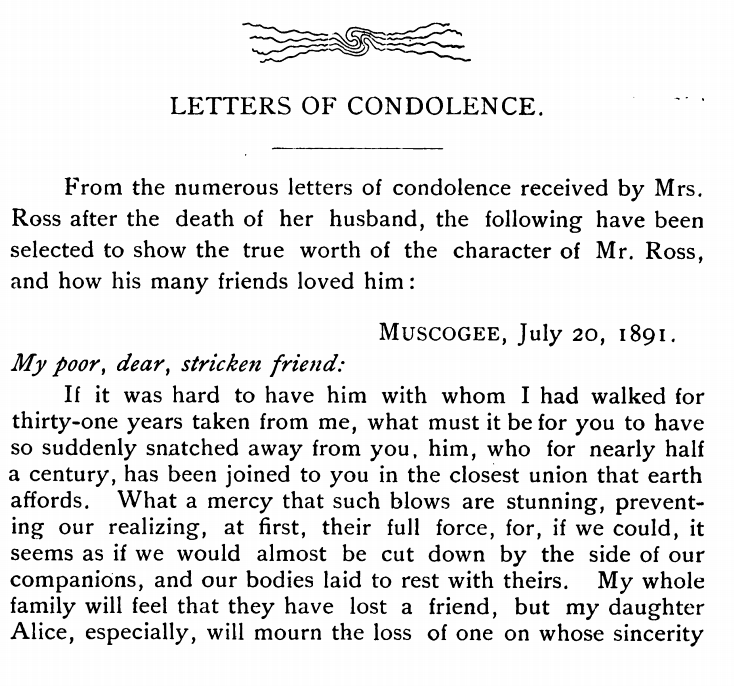
Letter of condolence to Mrs. William Potter Ross on the death of her husband

== See also ==
- Timeline of Cherokee removal
- Indian Removal Act
