= Osley Bird Saunooke =

Cherokee wrestler and politician

Principal Chief of the Eastern Band of Cherokee Indians
- In office 1951–1955
- Preceded by: Henry Bradley
- Succeeded by: Jarret Blythe
- In office 1959–1963
- Preceded by: Jarret Blythe
- Succeeded by: Jarret Blythe

Personal details
- Born: July 19, 1906 Yellowhill, North Carolina, U.S.
- Died: April 16, 1965 (aged 58) Asheville, North Carolina, U.S.
- Spouse: Bertha Smith (m. 1934)
- Occupation: Politician; Wrestler
- Military service
- Allegiance: United States
- Branch: United States Marine Corps
- Professional wrestling career
- Ring name: Chief Saunooke
- Billed height: 6 ft 6 in (198 cm)
- Billed weight: 369 lb (167 kg)
- Trained by: Charles Cutler
- Debut: 1937
- Retired: 1951

Osley Bird Saunooke (July 19, 1906 – April 16, 1965) was a professional wrestler and politician who served as the 16th Principal Chief of the Eastern Band of Cherokee Indians from 1951 to 1955 and from 1959 to 1963. He won the heavyweight title in 1937 from Thor Johnson and held it for fourteen years.

== Career ==
During the Great Depression, Saunooke began wrestling professionally and at one time weighed in at 369 pounds (167 kg). Billed as Chief Saunooke, he won the Super Heavyweight title in 1937 from Thor Johnson and held it for fourteen years. After taking part in more than five thousand matches, including seventeen main events in New York City's Madison Square Garden, he retired from the ring in 1951 and returned to Cherokee to enter business and wrestling promoter.

Also in 1951, Saunooke entered politics by becoming the 17th Principal Chief of the Eastern Band of Cherokee Indians. Saunooke served two nonconsecutive terms, from 951 to 1955 and from 1959 to 1963. In 1962, Saunooke was elected vice-president of the National Congress of American Indians. Saunooke is also credited with developing the Cherokee Reservation into a model reservation. Various tribes from all over the United States came to study governmental and sanitation systems installed under Saunooke's administration.

== Personal life ==
Born on July 19, 1906, to a Cherokee father and English mother, Saunooke was descended from a lineage of Indian chiefs for five generations. Saunooke attended Haskell Institute, where he was also a member of the football team. Afterwards he served in the U.S. Marines Corp, drove a taxicab, and worked in the wheat fields and on the railroad in the Midwest. In 1935 he married Bertha Smith, and they became the parents of five children. Saunooke passed-away on April 16, 1965, in Asheville, at the age of 58.

== Legacy ==
Since 1978, the Chief Osley B. Saunooke wrestling invitational takes place every year at Cherokee High School.

Preceded by Henry Bradley	Chief of the Eastern Band of Cherokee Indians; 1951-1955	Succeeded by Jarret Blythe
Preceded by Jarret Blythe	Chief of the Eastern Band of Cherokee Indians; 1959-1963	Succeeded by Jarret Blythe
