= Skiagusta =

Cherokee title for a war chief

A skiagusta /ˌskaɪəˈɡʌstə/ (ᎠᏍᎦᏯᎬᏍᏔ, also asgayagvsta, also skyagunsta, also skayagusta) (Note: /ˌskaɪəˈɡʌstə/ (ᎠᏍᎦᏯᎬᏍᏔ, asgayagvsta), also spelled skyagusta, skiagunsta, skyagunsta, skayagunsta, skygusta, askayagusta, asgayagusta, skyacust, or syacust.) (Note: Cherokee has 17 verb tenses, 10 persons, and six tones. See Neal, Dale (September 21, 2020). "Cracking the code to speak Cherokee". Asheville Citizen-Times.) is a Cherokee title for a war chief, known as the 'red chief' in times of turmoil. The skiagusta was the highest possible rank for a red chief; however, he remained subordinate to the council of the 'white', or peace, chief in non-tactical matters, even during wartime.

== Cherokee leaders ==
Before the 1794 establishment of the Cherokee Nation, the Cherokee people had no standing government. The citizens were all considered equal, although those with the ability to speak well were highly regarded and held more power in council. The Cherokee people as a whole were historically connected by a decentralized and loose confederacy of towns, villages, and settlements, each run by a "First Beloved Man"—the Uku. Although this person was not a chief in the literal sense, he was respected by the inhabitants, who deferred to the First Beloved Man in dealings with other towns and settlements, and other tribes or peoples.

== Chief and town designations ==
The Cherokee Towns of the eighteenth century were designated as being either red (war) or white (peace) towns. In times of strife, the leaders of the red towns gathered to a chosen war chief's council in order to conduct discussions and war ceremonies if needed. This war chief, or skiagusta, became the supreme leader of the warriors and responsible for directing hostilities towards the enemy. Skiagusta was the highest rank in the war council hierarchy, and stood immediately above the rank of outacite (or "mankiller").

The leaders of the peace (white) towns in these times continued to take council with a chosen peace chief, and the peace towns remained a haven or sanctuary for those people who needed protection. These included Native American petty criminals and escaping colonial slaves. The peace chief had the right to over-rule decisions made by the skiagusta at any given time.

The position of skiagusta was based on trust, ability, and continued success in battle. A war chief who was thought spiritually impure or was not successful on the battlefield was considered out of favor with the divine powers, and would be quickly replaced.

== Historical aliases ==
Several Cherokee leaders are known to historians only by their leadership titles. These include:

- Skiagunsta Cheowee, Cherokee leader contemporaneously known as Bread Slave Catcher, c. 1751
- Skayaguska Oukah, a leader of Tasseta Town, who visited England in 1730.
- Ostenaco Utsidihi (outacite or "mankiller"; eventually skiagusta or "war chief"), Cherokee leader of Tomotley Town, accompanied English colonist Henry Timberlake to London in 1762 after the latter man completed his expedition to the Overhill Cherokee. Ostenaco later was allied with Dragging Canoe, another Cherokee leader.

== See also ==
- Cherokee military history
- Traditional Native American Indian titles
- Ghigau, First Beloved Woman
- Tustenuggee, "war chief" in Muscogee and other Muskogean languages
