= Old Tassel =

"First Beloved Man" of the Overhill Cherokee

Old Tassel — Reyetaeh in Cherokee language, Koatohee, sometimes Corntassel (Cherokee language: Utsi'dsata, died 1788) — was "First Beloved Man" (the equivalent of a regional Cherokee chief) of the Overhill Cherokee after 1783, when the United States gained independence from Great Britain. He worked to try to keep the Cherokee people of the Overhill region out of the Cherokee–American wars being fought between the European-American frontiersmen and the Chickamauga band warriors led by Dragging Canoe. He was murdered in 1788 along with another chief at Chilhowee and 5 others by white settlers John Kirk, John Sevier and others, under a flag of truce.

== Family ==
Old Tassel's brothers were the warriors Pumpkin Boy and Doublehead. His maternal nephew was John Watts, known as "Young Tassel."

== Known history ==
Old Tassel became "First Beloved Man" of the Overhill Cherokee in 1783, after the tribal elders removed his predecessor, The Raven of Chota (also known as Savanukah). An advocate of peace, Old Tassel strove—with only some success—to keep the people of the Overhill towns out of the Cherokee–American wars being fought between the white settlers and the Chickamauga band, in what are now the eastern Tennessee and southeastern Kentucky regions. He was known as the Great Orator.

Reyetaeh signed the 1777 Treaty of Long Island, and 1786 Treaty of Hopewell with United States representatives. The treaty ostensibly protected the Overhill territory as Cherokee. The Americans had given Old Tassel an American flag sewed by Betsy Ross; he flew it over his door. He is described as being from Toquoe/Toquo in the 1777 and 1786 treaties, respectively.

In 1786 Old Tassel and Hanging Maw were forced to sign the Treaty of Coytoy, which threatened punishment if any murderer of whites was sheltered by the Cherokee. Representatives of the conditional State of Franklin said that they had been given rights to the territory from north of the Little Tennessee River to the Cumberland Mountains by North Carolina, although in 1785 this area had been affirmed by treaty as Cherokee territory.

== Notorious death ==
Outraged by the Treaty of Coytoy, in May 1788 a Cherokee party killed eleven of the twelve members of the John Kirk family, who were homesteaders on Little River southwest of present-day Knoxville, Tennessee. John Kirk, the head of the family, was away at the time. Col. John Sevier, who was attempting to suppress the Overhill uprisings, led retaliatory raids against numerous Cherokee towns in the Little Tennessee Valley. Another officer, Major James Hubbard, persuaded Old Tassel, chief Abraham of Chilhowee, and five other Cherokee to meet him to parley under a flag of truce at Abraham's house. He allowed Kirk to murder them by tomahawk for revenge in June 1788.

The Maryland Gazette harshly condemned the murders of the chiefs, saying that the flag of truce was "a protection inviolable even amongst the most barbarous people, sacred by the law and custom of nations..." The Cherokee considered these murders to be atrocities, and many gave new support to Dragging Canoe and his warriors afterward. Ultimately this resulted in the Cherokee Massacre at Cavett's Station on September 25, 1793, where the reported casualties were 13 settlers.

== Bibliography ==
- Alderman, Pat. Dragging Canoe: Cherokee-Chickamauga War Chief. (Johnson City: Overmountain Press, 1978)
- Brown, John P. Old Frontiers. (Kingsport: Southern Publishers, 1938).
- Haywood, W. H. The Civil and Political History of the State of Tennessee from its Earliest Settlement up to the Year 1796. (Nashville: Methodist Episcopal Publishing House, 1891).
- Moore, John Trotwood and Austin P. Foster. Tennessee, The Volunteer State, 1769–1923, Vol. 1. (Chicago: S. J. Clarke Publishing Co., 1923).
- Ramsey, James Gettys McGregor. The Annals of Tennessee to the End of the Eighteenth Century. (Chattanooga: Judge David Campbell, 1926).
- Brian Gene Corntassel, Descendant, Cherokee Nation Master Genealogist

Preceded by Savanukah	First Beloved Man; 1783–1788	Succeeded by Little Turkey
