= William P. Ross =

Cherokee leader (1820–1891)

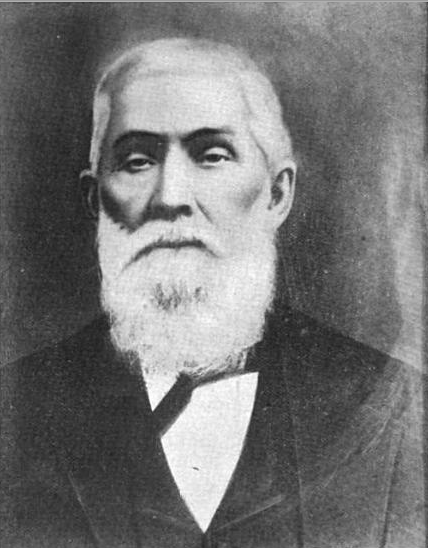

Principal Chief of the Cherokee Nation
- In office 1866–1867
- Preceded by: Lewis Downing
- Succeeded by: Lewis Downing
- In office 1872–1875
- Preceded by: Lewis Downing
- Succeeded by: Charles Thompson

Member of the Cherokee Nation Senate for the Tahlequah District
- In office 1849–1859

Personal details
- Born: William Potter Ross; August 28, 1820; Lookout Mountain, Tennessee, U. S.
- Died: July 20, 1891 (aged 70); Fort Gibson, Indian Territory, U. S.
- Citizenship: Cherokee Nation
- Political party: Ross Party
- Spouse: Mary Jane Ross
- Relatives: John Ross (uncle)
- Education: Princeton University
- Occupation: Lawyer, merchant, politician

Military service
- Allegiance: CSA
- Branch: Confederate States Army
- Rank: Lieutenant Colonel
- Unit: 1st Cherokee Mounted Rifles

William Potter Ross (August 28, 1820 – July 20, 1891), also known as Will Ross, was the Principal Chief of the Cherokee Nation from 1866-1867 and 1872-1875. Born to a Scottish father and a mixed-blood Cherokee sister of future chief John Ross, he was raised in a bilingual home. Ross attended English-speaking schools and the Princeton University, where he graduated first in his class in 1844.

Ross served in several different roles in the Cherokee Nation. By then, his uncle had been elected as principal chief. Ross became clerk of the Cherokee Senate in 1843. He became the founder and editor of the Cherokee Advocate. Later, he was appointed director of the Cherokee Male and Female seminaries, then served as Treasurer of the Cherokee Nation.

Ross was chosen to lead the Nation by the National Council on October 19, 1866, and served for several months until the election in 1867. He was later elected to succeed Lewis Downing, and served from 1872 to 1875. After his term ended, Ross retired to Fort Gibson, where he became a merchant and practiced law. He died there on July 20, 1891.

== Family, early life, and education ==
Ross was the son of John Golden Ross, who was born in Scotland December 23, 1787. Little more is known of his parents, except that they emigrated to North America with Will and his sister while the children were very young. The father was swept overboard during a violent storm, and his mother died before the ship reached land. The ship's captain gave the children to a couple in Baltimore who gave them a home. The sister died shortly, but young John grew up in Baltimore, where he attended school and became a cabinetmaker.

John Golden Ross left Baltimore (possibly about the time of the War of 1812), and went to Tennessee by himself. He enlisted in the Tennessee militia and fought in the Creek War under Andrew Jackson. He returned to Tennessee, where he married Eliza Ross. Eliza was part Cherokee and a sister of John Ross, who would be Principal Chief of the Cherokee Nation. Eliza had been born near Lookout Mountain on March 25, 1789. He and Eliza settled near Lookout Mountain, where they welcomed their first child, Will, on August 20, 1820.

Eliza began teaching young Will to read at home. The parents were bilingual, so Will learned early to communicate in both English and Cherokee. Later, he attended the Presbyterian Mission School at Will's Valley, Alabama. Then he went to an academy at Granville, Tennessee. When he was seventeen, he went to Hamill's Preparatory School at Lawrenceville, New Jersey. Will's uncle John sent him to Princeton, where he graduated in 1842, scholastically first in his class of 44 men. Consequently, he was abroad for the Trail of Tears.

== Cherokee politics ==
In the fall and winter of 1842–43, Will taught school held in a Methodist church near the present town of Hulbert, Oklahoma. He was elected clerk of the Cherokee Senate on October 3, 1843, where he helped write legislation and drafted papers for Chief John Ross, his uncle. During the session, the Council established the weekly newspaper Cherokee Advocate and named Will as editor. He continued in this position for four years. Retiring from the paper, he worked as a merchant and practiced law. In 1849, he was elected to the Cherokee Senate representing the Tahlequah District, where he served until 1859. In 1860, he became secretary to another uncle, Lewis Ross, who was then Treasurer of the Cherokee Nation.

He also was a lawyer, trader, sawmill owner, farmer, and businessman. He was very loyal to his uncle and strongly favored his uncle's policies. Otherwise, he had little in common with the full-bloods who were the core of the "Loyal party".

== American Civil War ==
The tribe was bitterly divided over the American Civil War. Immediately after war broke out between the Union and the Confederacy, many leading Cherokees wanted their tribe to remain neutral. One faction, led by Chief John Ross, believed that the tribe would fare best by remaining loyal to the Union. This group, known as the "Loyal Party," was composed largely of full-blood Cherokees who were not slave owners. But when the Union abandoned its forts in Indian Territory and Confederate troops moved in, neutrality was no longer an option. The council agreed to a treaty with the Confederate States of America, which Chief Ross signed. William Ross joined the 1st Cherokee Mounted Rifles and was appointed as a lieutenant colonel, but did not fight in the war.

== Principal Chief ==
The council elected Will as Principal Chief because they believed he had more experience and knowledge in the ways of government than did Downing. Moreover, Downing could not speak or read English, which would be a disadvantage in negotiations. The first act under Will's chieftainship was to amend the constitution and laws of the Cherokee Nation. First, the Council deleted all references to the institution of slavery. The second amendment gave citizenship, voting rights and the right to hold public office to all former Cherokee slaves that returned to live in the nation's boundaries by January 17, 1867. There was almost no opposition to these amendments because the "Southern Cherokees", who had followed Stand Watie and Elias C. Boudinot had previously fled the nation's boundaries and had boycotted the Council meetings. Thus, by popular vote on November 26, 1866, the Cherokee people approved the amendments.

The Southern Cherokees, as they were now known, held their own convention on December 31, 1866. They voted to send their own delegation to Washington. The new Secretary of the Interior, Orville H. Browning, accepted the members as legitimate delegates and held official meetings with them.

Despite his capabilities as principal chief, Ross could not bridge the gap between the Loyals and the Southerners to heal the wound. Ross hated the leaders of the Southern group, and they returned those feelings for him. He refused to allow the southerners any political influence, and even some of his friends felt he lacked the traditional spirit of tribal harmony. Stand Watie, in particular, remained in exile in Texas, where he had sent his family for safety. Ross refused to change his views, which led to an insurgency within his own party. It resulted in the close election of Lewis Downing of the Downing Party to replace Ross, who ran with support from the Ross Party, as chief in August 1867. After losing the election, Ross retired to private life at Fort Gibson, where he became a merchant and practiced law.

=== Second term ===
When Lewis Downing died in November 1872, the Downing Party controlled a majority in both houses of the Cherokee legislature. Charles Thompson was the Downing Party's preferred successor, but Ross won the legislative vote to succeed Downing, upsetting many outside of Ross's party. The full-bloods feared that they would lose the political advantage that Downing had helped them secure. They did not want the Cherokee Nation to be dominated by the English-speaking, wealthy mixed bloods. Externally, whites continued their political pressure to open Indian Territory for settlement and development by white people. Congress kept intruding into the decisions of who could qualify as a Cherokee citizen. Many of his fellow tribesmen blamed Ross for allowing an increase in all sorts of crimes, even though crime had increased all across the United States.

During the first two years of second term, the tribe saw growth in its agricultural production and cattle ranching. He also oversaw the opening of the Cherokee Orphan Asylum, a national prison, a new capitol building, and an “Asylum for the Indigent, Deaf, Dumb, and Blind.” In 1874, the legislature passed a new code of laws he supported, drastically reforming the nation's criminal justice system. He also spearheaded the creation of the nation's first medical board and created a new system for foreign worker permits. Despite championing social welfare reforms, Ross's government prioritized full and half blood Cherokee citizens over adopted citizens and Cherokee Freedmen.

Ross's efforts to find a locations for new orphan asylums generated controversy when the homes of Lewis Ross and Robert Ross where selected as the sites for the new orphanages. Both were deceased and Ross was an inheritor to both estates set to profit off the sale of the property. The incident provided fodder for the opposition campaign in the next election. Two violent incidents also marred his tenure. In August 1873, a group of men attacked a Cherokee citizen who fled into an election hall. The group of men followed him, fired their guns in the hall, and stopped citizens from voting. In December 1874, a sheriff's deputy killed a man in a gunfight with two ex-Confederate soldiers bootlegging whiskey. While the incident was relatively minor, the opposition used it to support a broader narrative of rising crime rates linked to Ross. Historian Noah Ramage described his tenure as upsetting "the stability of the postwar era" under Downing. While he was a very capable government official, he was "burdened by family history" and scandals.

== Later years and death ==
Will married his second wife, Mary Jane Ross, at Park Hill on November 16, 1846. She was the daughter of Lewis Ross.

Ross died at Fort Gibson on July 20, 1891. He was buried at Citizens Cemetery there. His wife, Mary Jane lived until July 29, 1908, when she also died and was buried in Fort Gibson.

== Works cited ==
- Anderson, William L. (January 15, 2010). "Ross, William Potter (1820–1891)". okhistory.org. The Encyclopedia of Oklahoma History and Culture.
- McLoughlin, William G. (1993). After the Trail of Tears: The Cherokees' Struggle for Sovereignty 1839-1880. Chapel Hill: University of North Carolina Press. ISBN 0-8078-2111-X.
- Meserve, John Bartlett (1937). "Chief William Potter Ross" (PDF). Chronicles of Oklahoma. 15 (1): 20–29.
- Ramage, Noah (2024). Phoenix on Fire: The Cherokee Nation from Reconstruction to Denationalization (PDF) (PhD thesis). Berkeley, California: University of California Berkeley.

Preceded by John Ross	Principal Chief of the Cherokee Nation; 1866–1867	Succeeded by Lewis Downing
Preceded by Lewis Downing	Principal Chief of the Cherokee Nation; 1872–1875	Succeeded by Charles Thompson
