= Outacité =

Cherokee warrior rank

Working

Outacité (also Mankiller) was a Cherokee military rank prior to the 20th century. The rank was immediately above that of pathkiller, and below the rank of skiagusta (war chief). This rank was considered the equivalent of the British rank of colonel during the French and Indian War.

A prominent outacité, Oukou-naka, later known as Atta-culla-culla (the Little Carpenter), was considered by some as one of the greatest Cherokees who ever lived. He became Peace Chief of the Nation, at a time associated with Oconostota as War Chief.
