= John Looney (Cherokee chief) =

Cherokee chief

John Looney (c. 1782–1846) was a Cherokee chief. As a young man, he served in the United States Army under Andrew Jackson. He later became chief of the Western Cherokee, in which capacity he negotiated with the U.S. government and dealt with conflicts with the rival Eastern Cherokee.

== Early life ==
Looney was born about 1782 in what is now the northeastern corner of Alabama. He was said to have been three quarters Cherokee by blood and a nephew of Chief Black Fox (Enoli). The earliest record of John Looney shows that he served from October 6, 1813, until January 6, 1814, during the Creek War (War of 1812) as a corporal in Capt. George Fields Company of Col. Gideon Morgan's Regiment of Cherokee Warriors under General Andrew Jackson. John Looney fought at the Battle of Emuckfaw in January 1814 and was severely wounded by a gunshot which went through his left shoulder blade, disabling him. Later in life, Looney applied for and received a pension in recognition of his military service and disabling wound. He was placed on the Invalid List at Fort Gibson Agency, Arkansas under the Act of April 14, 1842.

In 1815, John Looney married Betsy Weber, daughter of Will Weber, the mixed-blood headman of Willstown during the Cherokee–American wars. Looney's daughter Eleanor was the first wife of Stand Watie. Looney's Reservation was located at "Creekpath, to include the place where Black Fox lived and died."

== Moves west ==
John and Betsy Looney left Creekpath about 1823 and moved west into Arkansas along with other Cherokee. Looney had placed his reservation at Creekpath in the care of his two sisters, Peggy Mink and Susannah, who were forced off of the property by Euro-Americans. An appeal for the loss of the Reservation was filed on behalf of Looney's children, but the court ruled that Looney had forfeit the property back to the U.S. Government when he abandoned it and moved west. Looney's Reservation was never surveyed.

Around 1828 Looney and the other Cherokee who lived in Arkansas were forced to move farther west into what later became Indian Territory (N.E. Oklahoma). This group of Cherokee were recognized as the "Western Cherokee" and sometimes referred to as the "Old Settlers" or the "Old Settlers-Treaty Party".

John Looney, who had been elected as Third Chief, became Principal Chief of the Western Cherokee after the death of John Jolly on December 28, 1838. It was about this time that the Eastern Cherokee were arriving from the west due to their forced removal from North Carolina, Tennessee, Georgia, and Alabama. The Eastern Cherokee had brought with them their own Constitution and Principal Chief, John Ross, which they did not intend to give up. The Western Cherokee, anticipating trouble with the new arrivals, held a new election on April 22, 1839, and elected John Brown, Principal Chief, and John Looney and John Rogers as Second and Third Chiefs.

== Cherokee civil conflicts ==
There was conflict between the Eastern and Western Cherokee and on June 22, 1839, several members of the Old Settlers-Treaty Party were murdered. Major Ridge, his son John Ridge and Elias Boudinot were killed while Stand Watie escaped. John Ross, Principal Chief of the Eastern Cherokee, denied any involvement in or knowledge of the murders. Soon after this John Ross held a National Convention for the East and West Cherokee beginning July 1, 1839. He appointed a committee to draft a new Constitution and made Sequoyah (also known as George Guess or Gist) President of the Old Settlers. He was able to persuade John Looney to agree to his plans, having Looney, Guess and "Tobacco Will" depose John Brown and John Rogers as Chiefs of the Old Settlers. The Convention and new Constitution were completed on Sept. 6, 1839 and John Ross was immediately elected as Principal Chief with Joseph Vann as his assistant principal chief.

Looney died May 15, 1846, at the Fuller Hotel in Washington, D.C., while serving as a Delegate for the Cherokee Nation.

Preceded by John Jolly	Principal Chief of the Cherokee Nation–West; 1838–1839	Succeeded by John Brown

Preceded by John Brown	Principal Chief of the Cherokee Nation–West; 1839	Succeeded by Title ceased to exist (see John Ross)
