= Savanukah =

Cherokee chief

Savanukahwn was a Raven of Chota and Principal Chief of the Cherokee in the late 18th Century. The nephew of Oconostota, he became First Beloved Man in the fall of 1781. He was ousted by the elders of the Overhill towns in 1783 in favor of the more pacifist Old Tassel.

During the Second Cherokee War, Savanukahwn led the attack against the frontier settlements of Carter's Valley in 1776, in what is now Eastern Tennessee but was Cherokee territory. Dragging Canoe of Great Island led the attack on the settlements along the Holston River, and Abraham of Chilhowie led the attacks on the Watauga and Nolichucky rivers, also in what is now East Tennessee.

== Sources ==
- Alderman, Pat. Dragging Canoe: Cherokee-Chickamauga War Chief. (Johnson City: Overmountain Press, 1978)
- Brown, John P. Old Frontiers. (Kingsport: Southern Publishers, 1938).
- Haywood, W.H. The Civil and Political History of the State of Tennessee from its Earliest Settlement up to the Year 1796. (Nashville: Methodist Episcopal Publishing House, 1891).
- Moore, John Trotwood and Austin P. Foster. Tennessee, The Volunteer State, 1769-1923, Vol. 1. (Chicago: S. J. Clarke Publishing Co., 1923).
- Ramsey, James Gettys McGregor. The Annals of Tennessee to the End of the Eighteenth Century. (Chattanooga: Judge David Campbell, 1926).

| Preceded by Oconostota | First Beloved Man; 1781–1783 | Succeeded by Corntassel |
