= Ross Swimmer =

Former Principal Chief of the Cherokee Nation (born 1943)

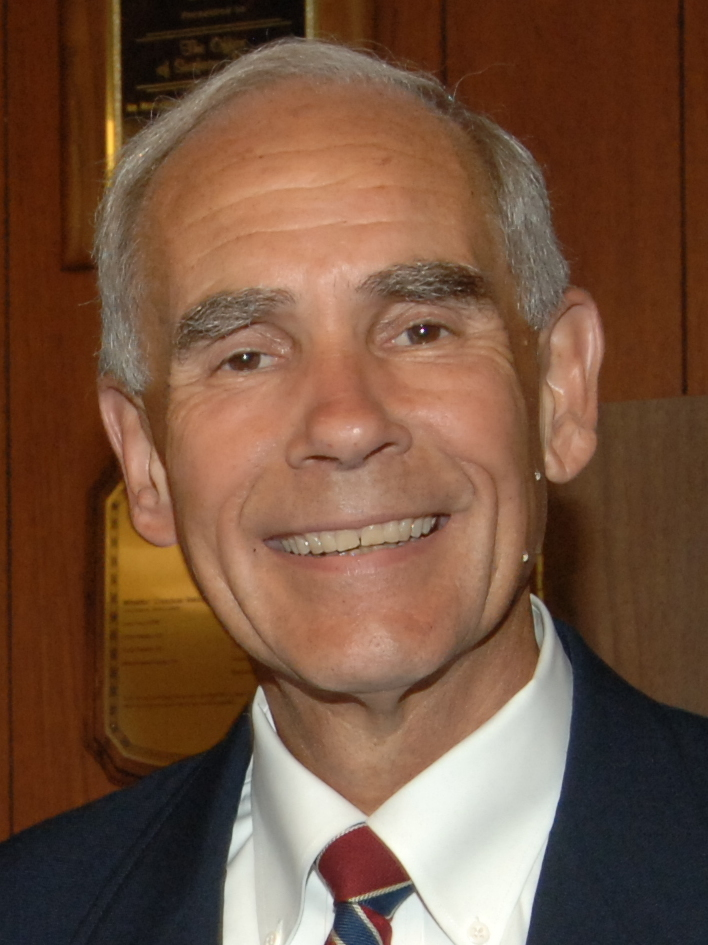

4th Assistant Secretary of the Interior for Indian Affairs
- In office 1985–1989
- President: Ronald Reagan
- Preceded by: Kenneth Smith
- Succeeded by: Eddie Frank Brown

Principal Chief of the Cherokee Nation
- In office 1975–1985
- Deputy: Wilma Mankiller
- Preceded by: W. W. Keeler
- Succeeded by: Wilma Mankiller

Personal details
- Born: October 26, 1943 (age 83) Oklahoma City, Oklahoma, U.S.
- Party: Republican
- Spouse: Margaret Swimmer
- Children: 2
- Education: University of Oklahoma (BA, JD)

Ross Owen Swimmer (rear third from right)

Ross O. Swimmer (born October 26, 1943) served as the Special Trustee for American Indians at the U.S. Department of the Interior from 2003 to 2009. He was formerly the Principal Chief of the Cherokee Nation. He is a Republican.

Swimmer is 1/4 Cherokee by blood.

== Education ==
Swimmer attended the University of Oklahoma, where he received both his Bachelor of Arts and Juris Doctor degrees. While there, he was a member of Alpha Sigma Phi fraternity.

== Career ==
He is a citizen of the Cherokee Nation and served as Principal Chief from 1975 to 1985, when he resigned to accept the position of Assistant Secretary of Indian Affairs with the Bureau of Indian Affairs, a bureau within the U.S. Department of the Interior. Wilma Mankiller, Deputy Chief of the Cherokee Nation succeeded Swimmer as Chief of the Cherokees. In 1987, he visited East Germany, resulting in excitement as the East-German population was fascinated by Western (genre).

Swimmer served as president of the Cherokee Group, L.L.C., from 1995 until 2001. The Group is a consulting firm that represents Indian clients engaged in government issues at the state and federal level, and supports the development of businesses on Indian lands. He was also Of Counsel to the Tulsa, Oklahoma, based law firm of Hall Estill, where his wife Margaret is a Partner.

Working with the Rensselaerville Institute in New York, Swimmer created a self-help program for rural community development.

On November 26, 2001, he was appointed by the Bush administration to be the Director of the Office of Indian Trust Transition, which is a Department of Interior office that is attempting to bring the Indian Trust accounting process up to minimum court-ordered standards (Cobell v. Kempthorne).

Political offices
Preceded by W. W. Keeler	Principal Chief of the Cherokee Nation; 1975–1985	Succeeded by Wilma Mankiller
