= Ostenaco =

Cherokee Indian warrior

- ᎤᏍᏔᎾᏆ
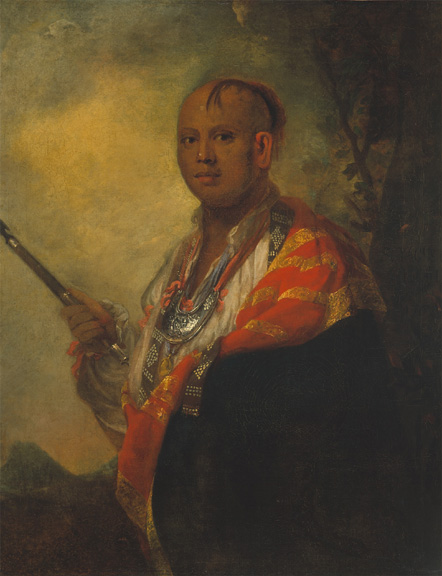
- Portrait of Ostenaco by Joshua Reynolds, 1762
- Born: c. 1710; Great Tellico
- Died: 1780; Ooltewah, Hamilton County, Tennessee, United States
- Citizenship: Cherokee
- Occupation: War chief

Ostenaco (Note: Other spellings of Ostenaco include Osteneco, Ostinaco, Austenaco, Ousteneka, Ustenacah, Oostenaca, and Ustoneeka.) (/ˈoʊtəˌsɪti ˌoʊstɪˈnækoʊ/; Cherokee: ᎤᏍᏔᎾᏆ, romanized: Ustanaqua, or "Bighead"; c. 1710 – 1780) was a Cherokee leader, warrior, orator, and leader of diplomacy with British colonial authorities in the 18th century. By his thirties, he had assumed the warrior rank of "otacity" (mankiller), and the title "tassite" of Great Tellico. He eventually rose to assume the higher Cherokee rank of chief-warrior (or "skiagusta"—meaning 'red chief'). (Note: The rank, otacity (meaning 'man-killer'), has a variety of spellings in historical documents: antossity, outacity, otacité, outacité, ooskasedee, otossity, outasseti, outasseté, outassatah, wootasité, ontasseté, or utsidihi. The indian tribal ranks were often mistaken to be names by Euro-American colonial peoples.)

== Early life ==
Ostenaco was born in the settled Cherokee town of Tellico in present-day Tellico Plains, Tennessee, in c. 1710. It has been conjectured that he was born into the Ani-waya (Wolf) clan, which was associated with bearing the most warriors. He was often referred to among white colonists as Judd's Friend, referring to his relationship of a trader by that name (Note: Goodpasture (1918) writes that Ostenaco earned the nickname Judd's Friend "from his humanity in saving a man of that name from the fury of his countrymen". Rothrock (1976) writes of a custom among the Cherokee: "As soon as a trader had won the confidence and admiration of his Indian acquaintances, he was chosen by some warrior as a 'particular friend.' This was a generally recognized and well defined relationship, which was symbolized by a complete exchange of clothing and sometimes of names as well. It lasted throughout life, binding the Indian, at least, in loyalty to his special friend; and often it was the means of saving the white man's life. This custom is reflected in the name 'Judd's Friend' which was applied to the great warrior Ostenaco.") (Note: Also in the corrupted forms "Judge's Friend", "Judge Friend", and "the Judge".) After the Creek Indians assaulted Tellico in 1753, he resettled in Tomotley in present-day Monroe County, Tennessee.

== French and Indian War ==
During the French and Indian War, Ostenaco at first aided Virginia against the French and the Shawnee, leading his warriors over 3,500 miles on foot and by canoe to support the colonists. In 1756, he led 130 Cherokees in the Sandy Creek Expedition, a joint Cheroke–Virginia Colony campaign on the frontier of what is now West Virginia. In 1757 and 1758, his war party raided the French stronghold at Fort Duquesne (located in present-day Pittsburgh), eventually taking it. When part of the victorious war party was on its way back home, however, it was indiscriminately ambushed by Virginia frontiersmen who killed 20 of his men. In retaliation, the Cherokee of that region embarked on a campaign against the British colonists that lasted for the next three years. The uneasy peace that followed resulted in a 1761–1762 winter peace expedition, which was the colonial army's attempt at reestablishing friendship with their once-allied Cherokee tribes.

== Timberlake Expedition ==
The expeditionary party, made up of Lieutenant Henry Timberlake, Sergeant Thomas Sumter, John McCormack (an interpreter), and an unnamed servant, arrived in the Overhill Cherokee town of Tomotley on December 20, 1761, where they were greeted by Ostenaco, one of the leading men in the town, who was visiting from Keowee. After spending several days in Tomotley as guests of Ostenaco, Timberlake and his interpreter proceeded to the Overhill mother-town of Chota, where a number of chiefs had gathered in the town's large council-house. Ostenaco gave a speech and ceremonially buried a hatchet in the ground, symbolizing a state of peace between the English and the Cherokee. Afterward, Timberlake took part in a peace ceremony in which he smoked several ceremonial pipes with the gathered chiefs, a practice Timberlake personally found "very disagreeable," but participated without openly complaining.

=== Journey to London ===
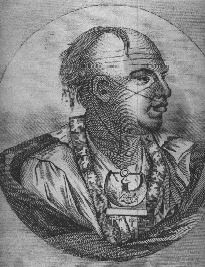
Portrait of Ostenaco by Joshua Reynolds, 1762

On January 2, 1762, Timberlake returned to Tomotley with Ostenaco, his assignment largely completed. Timberlake spent the next few weeks studying Cherokee habits and making notes for his maps of the Overhill country. At the end of January, rumors began trickling in from Cherokee scouts of renewed hostilities with rival tribes to the north. Timberlake grew anxious and begged Ostenaco to guide him back to Virginia. Ostenaco reluctantly agreed, and the party set out on March 10, 1762, arriving in Williamsburg in early April.

While in Williamsburg, Timberlake and Ostenaco attended a dinner party at William & Mary College at which Ostenaco professed his desire to meet the king of England. A young Thomas Jefferson, then a student at the college, later wrote of Ostenaco:

"I knew much of the great Outassete (Ostenaco), the warrior and orator of the Cherokee. He was always the guest of my father on his journeys to and from Williamsburg. I was in his camp when he made his great farewell oration to his people the evening before he departed for England. The moon was in full splendour, and to her he seemed to address himself in his prayers for his own safety on the voyage and that of his people during his absence. His sounding voice, distinct articulation, animated action, and the solemn silence of his people at their several fires, filled me with awe and veneration, although I did not understand a single word he uttered."

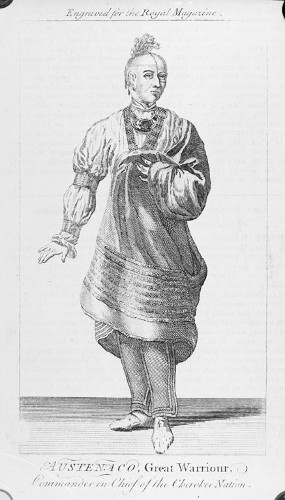
Drawing of Chief Ostenaco during his visit to London, 1762, by Joshua Reynolds

In May 1762, Timberlake, Sumter, and three distinguished Cherokee leaders, including Ostenaco, departed for London. Arriving in early June, the Cherokee were an immediate attraction, drawing crowds all over the city. The poet Oliver Goldsmith queued for over three hours to meet the Cherokee, and offered him a gift. Ostenaco thanked him by kissing him on both cheeks, leaving them smeared with ochre, which caused bystanders to laugh, and discomforted Goldsmith, who didn't expect that 'natives' would apply makeup as heavy as that common in European society. It may have been Goldsmith who suggested to his friend Joshua Reynolds to paint Ostenaco's portrait. Reynolds was not satisfied with the result, as he failed to find a solution to the need for harmonizing neoclassical principles about conveying something universal while catering to contemporary tastes in individualized features. Thus he chose to ignore his subject's tattoos and ochre makeup, while depicting his wampum and hairstyle against a forested mountain backdrop. As a result, he put the portrait, entitled 'Syacust Ukah', into storage.

=== Return ===
The Cherokees returned to North America with Thomas Sumter in August 1762. The trip secured for Ostenaco lasting fame on both sides of the Atlantic, and Timberlake married a daughter of Ostenaco.

== American Revolution ==
During the Second Cherokee War, Ostenaco was the chief war leader of the Cherokee Lower Towns in western South Carolina/northeast Georgia, and was allied with the British forces. In 1776 he led their attack against the Province of Georgia. After the destruction of the Lower Towns in the retaliation which followed, Ostenaco led his people west. The majority resettled in what is now far northern Georgia, with Ustanali as their chief town. Some followed him into the Cherokee–American wars with Dragging Canoe, and settled with him in the Chickamauga (now Chattanooga, Tennessee) region at the town of Ooltewah (Ultiwa'i, "owl's nest") on Ooltewah Creek (in the modern Hamilton County, Tennessee).

== Death ==
Ostenaco died at the home of his grandson, Richard Timberlake, the son of Henry Timberlake and Ostenaco's daughter, at Ooltewah in 1780.

== Sources ==
- Dennis, Jeff W. (2017). Patriots & Indians: Shaping Identity in Eighteenth-Century South Carolina. University of South Carolina Press. ISBN 978-1-611-17757-2.
- Fullagar, Kate (2020). The Warrior, the Voyager, and the Artist: Three Lives in an Age of Empire. Yale University Press. ISBN 978-0-300-24927-9.
- Timberlake, Henry (2007). King, Duane H. (ed.). The Memoirs of Lt. Henry Timberlake: The Story of a Soldier, Adventurer, and Emissary to the Cherokees, 1756-1765. University of North Carolina Press. ISBN 978-0-807-83126-7.
- Wood, Douglas McClure (Autumn 2008). ""I Have Now Made a Path to Virginia": Outacite Ostenaco and the Cherokee-Virginia Alliance in the French and Indian War". West Virginia History. 2 (2): 31–60. doi:10.1353/wvh.0.0018. JSTOR 43264805. S2CID 159920290.

== Bibliography ==
- Evans, E. Raymond (1976), "Notable Persons in Cherokee History: Ostenaco", Journal of Cherokee Studies, 1 (1), Cherokee: Museum of the Cherokee Indian: 41–54
- Goodpasture, Albert Virgil (1918). "Portrait of Judge Friend". Tennessee Historical Magazine. Vol. 4, no. 3. Nashville: The Tennessee Historical Society.
