= Raven of Chota =

Title given to Cherokee war leaders from Chota

The Raven of Chota was a title given to Cherokee war leaders from the town of Chota. In time of war, Ravens scouted ahead of war parties to search for the enemy. According to historian Colin Calloway, "Every Cherokee town had 'Ravens,' but the Raven of Chota was the most prominent."

Savanukah (or "Savanooka"), nephew of Oconostota, was the Raven of Chota at the time of the American Revolution. In 1775 he was a signer of the Treaty of Sycamore Shoals with Attakullaculla and Oconostota.
