= William G. McLoughlin =

American historian (1922–1992)

William Gerald McLoughlin (June 11, 1922 – December 28, 1992) was an American historian and prominent member of the history department at Brown University from 1954 to 1992. His subject areas were the history of religion in the United States, revivalism, the Cherokee, missionaries to Native Americans, abolitionism, and Rhode Island.

== Early life and education ==
William G. McLoughlin was born in Maplewood, New Jersey. He earned his B.A. from Princeton University in 1947, graduating Phi Beta Kappa after having taken a three-year hiatus from his studies to serve as a first lieutenant in the field artillery in World War II. He did graduate work in history, receiving his M.A. from Harvard in 1948 and his Ph.D. in the History of American Civilization from Harvard in 1953.

== Academic career ==
McLoughlin started as an assistant professor at Brown. In 1963, he was promoted to a full professorship. In 1981, he was appointed the Annie McClelland and Willard Prescott Smith Professor of History and Religion. In 1992, McLoughlin was named the first Chancellor's Fellow at Brown, allowing him to continue teaching although he had earned emeritus status.

His many publications won him wide recognition, including the 1972 Frederic C. Melcher Prize for the best book on religion in America, for his New England Dissent (1971). McLoughlin was regarded as “one of the country’s most distinguished historians of American religion.”

== Other civic activities ==
McLoughlin opposed American involvement in the Vietnam War and was active in the civil rights movement. He was a former chair of the Rhode Island American Civil Liberties Union. A major religion case that McLoughlin and the Rhode Island ACLU took on in 1984 was ultimately heard by the U.S. Supreme Court (Lynch v. Donnelly).

For his work to advance civil rights, in 2004 McLoughlin was posthumously inducted into the Rev. Dr. Martin Luther King Jr. Memorial Hall of Fame in Providence, Rhode Island, along with Robert Bailey IV.

== Books ==
(listed in chronological order)

- Billy Sunday Was His Real Name. (University of Chicago Press, 1955)
- Modern Revivalism: Charles Grandison Finney to Billy Graham. (Ronald Press, 1959)
- Billy Graham, Revivalist in a Secular Age. (Ronald Press, 1960)
- Isaac Backus and the American Pietistic Tradition. (Little, Brown, 1967)
- Meaning of Henry Ward Beecher: An Essay on the Shifting Values of Mid-Victorian America, 1840-1870. (Knopf, 1970)
- New England Dissent, 1630-1833: The Baptists and the Separation of Church and State. (Harvard University Press, 1971)
- Revivals, Awakenings, and Reform: An Essay on Religion and Social Change in America, 1607-1977. (University of Chicago Press, 1978)
- Rhode Island: A Bicentennial History. (W.W. Norton, 1978)
- Cherokees and Missionaries, 1789-1839. (Yale University Press, 1984)
- Cherokee Renascence in the New Republic. (Princeton University Press, 1986)
- Rhode Island, a History. (W.W. Norton and the American Association for State and Local History, 1986)
- Champions of the Cherokees: Evan and John B. Jones. (Princeton University Press, 1990)
- Soul Liberty: The Baptists' Struggle in New England, 1630-1833. (University Press of New England, 1991)
- After the Trail of Tears: The Cherokees' Struggle for Sovereignty, 1839-1880. (University of North Carolina Press, 1993)
- Cherokees and Christianity, 1794-1870: Essays on Acculturation and Cultural Persistence. (University of Georgia Press, 1994)
