= Cherokee–American wars =

Indigenous wars in the Old Southwest

American–Cherokee wars
- Part of the American Revolutionary War, the American Indian Wars, and the Northwest Indian War
Date	Summer 1776 – 26 November 1794
Location	Present-day Tennessee, Kentucky, Virginia, North Carolina, South Carolina, Georgia, and Alabama
Result	United States victory: Treaty of Hopewell (1785); Treaty of Holston (1791); Treaty of Tellico Blockhouse (1794)
Territorial changes	Large cessions of Cherokee land to the United States.

Belligerents
United States	Cherokee; Spanish Empire (Note: After 1783, officials in Spanish Louisiana supplied the Chickamauga Cherokee with firearms, ammunition, and other military supplies in an effort to limit United States expansion. Spain was not a formal belligerent in the conflict.)

Commanders and leaders
John Sevier; Isaac Shelby; James Robertson; Andrew Pickens; Anthony Wayne	Dragging Canoe †; John Watts; Little Turkey; Doublehead

Strength
Unknown	Unknown

Casualties and losses
Unknown	Unknown

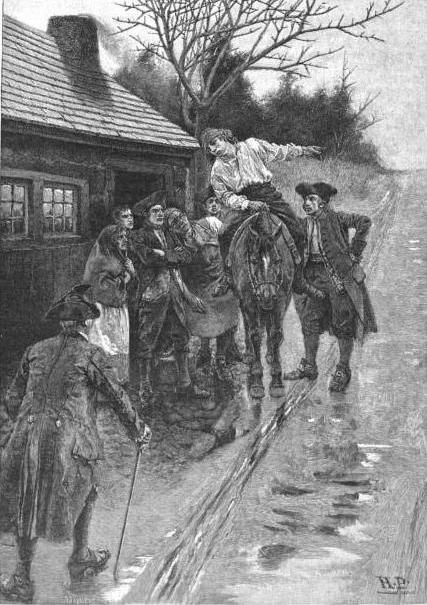
The Cherokees are Coming!, an illustration depicting a scout warning the residents of Knoxville, Tennessee, of the approach of a large Cherokee force in September 1793

The Cherokee–American wars, also known as the Chickamauga Wars, were a series of raids, campaigns, ambushes, minor skirmishes, and several full-scale frontier battles in the Old Southwest from 1776 to 1794 between the Cherokee and American settlers on the frontier. Most of the events took place in the Upper South region. While the fighting stretched across the entire period, there were extended periods with little or no action.

The Cherokee leader Dragging Canoe, whom some earlier historians called "the Savage Napoleon", and his warriors, and other Cherokee fought alongside warriors from several other tribes, most often the Muscogee in the Old Southwest and the Shawnee in the Old Northwest. During the Revolutionary War, they also fought alongside British troops, Loyalist militia, and the King's Carolina Rangers against the rebel colonists, hoping to expel them from their territory.

Open warfare broke out in the summer of 1776 in the Overmountain settlements of the Washington District, mainly those along the Watauga, Holston, Nolichucky, and Doe rivers in East Tennessee, as well as the colonies (later states) of Virginia, North Carolina, South Carolina, and Georgia. It eventually spread to settlements along the Cumberland River in Middle Tennessee and in Kentucky.

The wars can be divided into two phases. The first phase took place from 1776 to 1783, in which the Cherokee fought as allies of the Kingdom of Great Britain against the American colonies. The Cherokee War of 1776 encompassed the entirety of the Cherokee nation. At the end of 1776, the only militant Cherokee were those who migrated with Dragging Canoe to the Chickamauga towns and became known as the "Chickamauga Cherokee". The second phase lasted from 1783 to 1794. The Cherokee served as proxies of the Viceroyalty of New Spain against the recently formed United States of America. Because they migrated westward to new settlements initially known as the "Five Lower Towns", referring to their location in the Piedmont, these people became known as the Lower Cherokee. This term was used well into the 19th century. The Chickamauga ended their warfare in November 1794 with the Treaty of Tellico Blockhouse.

In 1786, Mohawk leader Joseph Brant, a major war chief of the Iroquois, had organized the Western Confederacy of tribes to resist American settlement in Ohio Country. The Lower Cherokee were founding members and fought in the Northwest Indian War that resulted from this conflict. The Northwest Indian War ended with the Treaty of Greenville in 1795.

The conclusion of the Indian wars enabled the settlement of what had been called "Indian territory" in the Royal Proclamation of 1763, and culminated in the first trans-Appalachian states, Kentucky in 1792 and Ohio in 1803.

== Prelude (1763–75) ==
The French and Indian War and the related European theater conflict known as the Seven Years' War laid many of the foundations for the conflict between the Cherokee and the American settlers on the frontier. These tensions on the frontier broke out into open hostilities with the advent of the American Revolution.

=== Aftermath of the French and Indian War ===
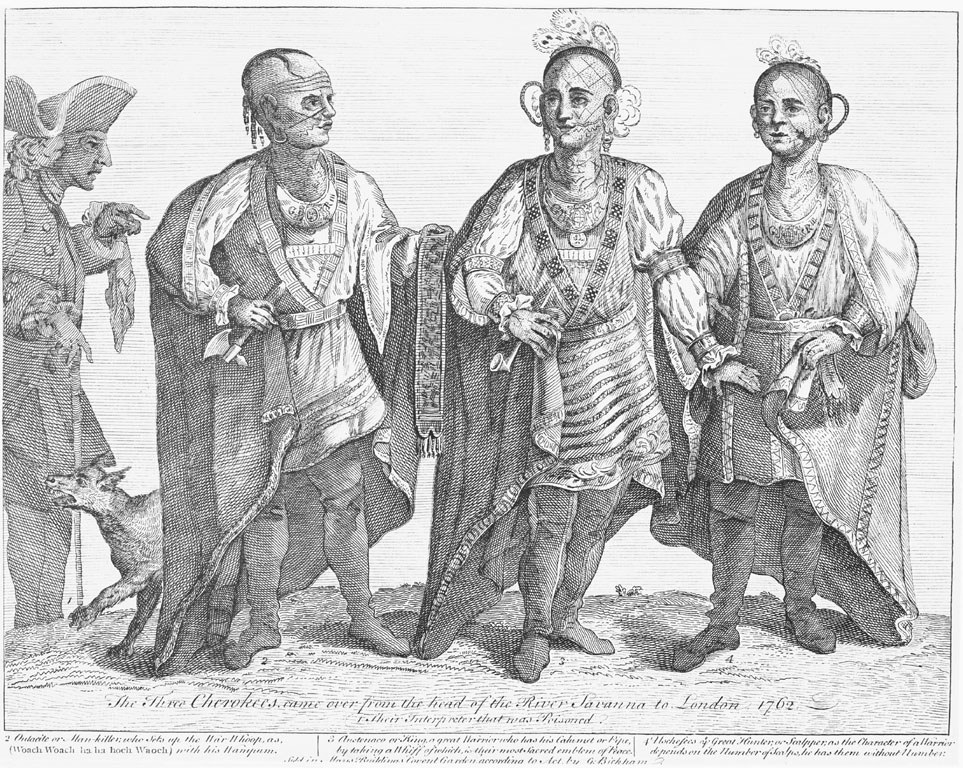
A commander of Fort Patrick Henry sent Henry Timberlake as a token of friendship after the Anglo-Cherokee War. Timberlake later took three Cherokee to London, 1763.

The action of the French and Indian War in North America included the Anglo-Cherokee War, lasting 1758–1761. British forces under General James Grant destroyed a number of Cherokee towns, which were never reoccupied. Kituwa was abandoned, and its former residents migrated west. They took up residence at Mialoquo, called Great Island Town, on the Little Tennessee River among the Overhill Cherokee. At the end of this conflict, the Cherokee signed the Treaty of Long-Island-on-the-Holston with the Colony of Virginia (1761) and the Treaty of Charlestown with the Province of South Carolina (1762). Conocotocko (Standing Turkey), the First Beloved Man during the conflict, was replaced by Attakullakulla, who was pro-British.

Having concluded the Treaty of Paris in 1763 to settle the European conflict, the British hoped to maintain peace in the colonies and were surprised with the outbreak of Pontiac's War in the north soon thereafter. In response, King George III hastened to issue the Royal Proclamation of 1763 in an effort to impose a boundary between the native tribes and encroaching colonists. The proclamation prohibited colonial settlement west of the Appalachian Mountains, at least temporarily, but was widely resented by the colonists.

=== Treaties and land cession ===
Once they were able to end hostilities with Pontiac's confederation, the British refocused their attention to settling treaties that could resolve land claims with tribes across the colonies. The two Superintendents for Indian Affairs for the northern and southern colonies contemporaneously negotiated the Treaty of Hard Labour with the Cherokee and the Treaty of Fort Stanwix with the Iroquois in 1768. The Cherokee were initially to retain their lands west of the Kanawha River, from its confluence with the Ohio to its headwaters, with the boundary continuing south to Spanish Florida.

However, colonists in the Cherokee region continued to ignore the treaty line, in part because Fort Stanwix promulgated a boundary in the north that simply continued west along the Ohio. To further adjust the boundary, John Stuart, as Superintendent for Southern Indian Affairs, negotiated a second treaty with the Cherokee in 1770, the Treaty of Lochaber. This surrendered their remaining claims in what is now West Virginia and Kentucky and protected colonists north of the Holston River, in the region of today's Tennessee-Virginia border.

=== Early colonial settlements ===
The earliest colonial settlement in the vicinity of what became Upper East Tennessee was Sapling Grove (Bristol). This initial North-of-Holston settlement was founded by Evan Shelby, who first entered the area as early as 1765, but "purchased" the land in 1768 from John Buchanan. Jacob Brown began another settlement on the Nolichucky River, and John Carter another in what became known as Carter's Valley (between Clinch River and Beech Creek), both in 1771. Following the Battle of Alamance in 1771, James Robertson led a group of some twelve or thirteen Regulator families from North Carolina to the Watauga River. On May 8, 1772, the settlers on the Watauga and on the Nolichucky signed the Watauga Compact to form the Watauga Association.

Each of the groups thought they were within the territorial limits of the colony of Virginia. After a survey proved their mistake, Alexander Cameron, Deputy Superintendent for Indian Affairs, ordered them to leave. Attakullakulla, First Beloved Man (Principal Chief) of the Cherokee, interceded on their behalf. The settlers were allowed to remain, provided no additional people joined them.

In 1769, developers and land speculators planned to start a new colony called Vandalia in the territory ceded by the Cherokee. Plans for that fell through, however, and Virginia annexed it as the District of West Augusta in 1774. On June 1, 1773, the Cherokee and the Muskogee ceded their claims to 2 million acres in the northern sector of the Georgia colony, in return for the cancellation of their debts. Most of the Muskogee refused to recognize the treaty, and the British government rejected it.

==== Boone party massacre ====
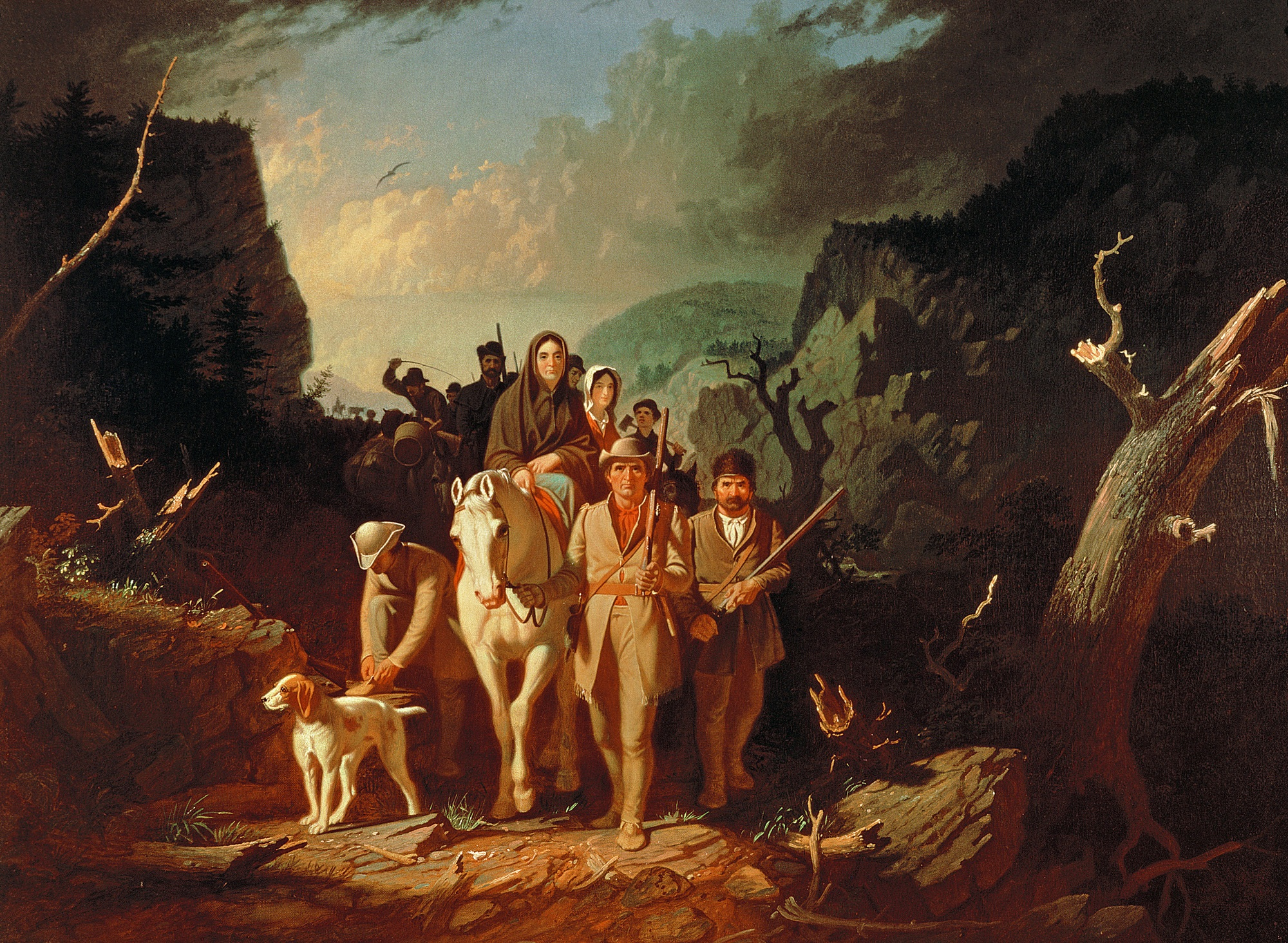
An 1851 history painting portrays Boone's first crossing of the Cumberland Gap with a party of settlers in 1773. (Daniel Boone Escorting Settlers through the Cumberland Gap, by George Caleb Bingham, oil on canvas, 1851)

In Sept. 1773, Daniel Boone led one of the first settler's expeditions through the fabled Cumberland Gap route to establish a temporary settlement inside the hunting grounds of modern-day Kentucky. There were about 50 settlers in the group. The Shawnee, Lenape (Delaware), Mingo, and some Cherokee attacked a scouting and forage party, which included Boone's son James. James Boone and Henry Russell, son of William Russell, a compatriot of Daniel Boone, were captured by the Native Americans and ritually tortured to death. The settlement attempt was abandoned. When word got back to Virginia, the colonists led by Lord Dunmore himself retaliated with Dunmore's War (1774) which was conducted mostly against Shawnee raiders from north of the Ohio.

The Cherokee and the Muskogee were active also, mainly confining themselves to small raids on the backcountry settlements of the Carolinas and Georgia.

==== Henderson Purchase (1775) ====
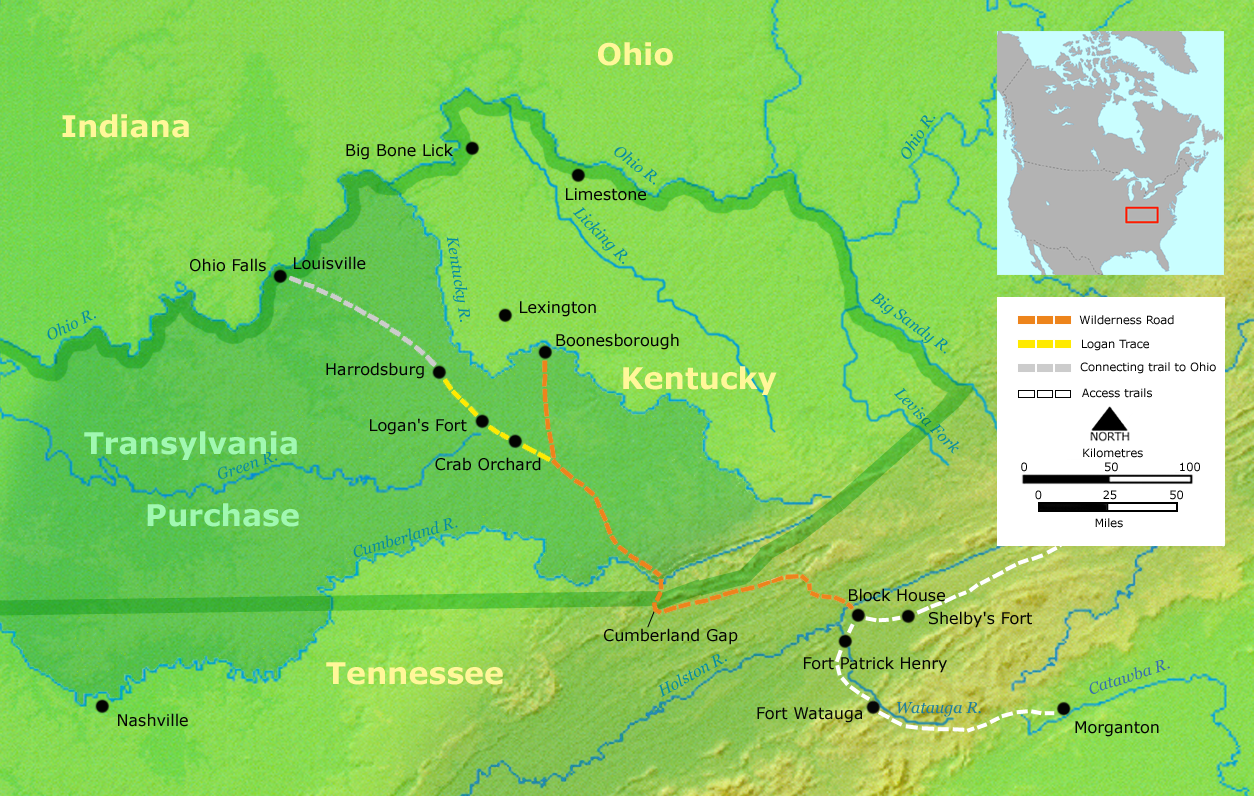
The Wilderness Road and the Transylvania purchase.

On March 17, 1775, a group of North Carolina speculators led by Richard Henderson negotiated the extra-legal Treaty of Watauga at Sycamore Shoals with the older Overhill Cherokee leaders; Oconostota and Attakullakulla, the most prominent, ceded the claim of the Cherokee to the Kentucky lands. The Transylvania Land Company believed it was gaining ownership of the land, not realizing that other tribes, such as the Lenape, Shawnee, and Chickasaw, also claimed these lands for hunting.

Dragging Canoe, headman of Great Island Town and son of Attakullakulla, refused to go along with the deal. He told the North Carolina men, "You have bought a fair land, but there is a cloud hanging over it; you will find its settlement dark and bloody". This utterance gave rise to the contentious epithet for Kentucky as the dark and bloody ground. The phrase became a metaphor for the entire struggle for the Southern frontier. The governors of Virginia and North Carolina repudiated the Watuga treaty, and Henderson fled to avoid arrest. George Washington also spoke out against it. The Cherokee appealed to John Stuart, the Indian Affairs Superintendent, for help, which he had provided on previous such occasions, but the outbreak of the American Revolution intervened.

Henderson and frontiersmen thought the outbreak of the Revolution superseded the judgments of the royal governors. The Transylvania Company began recruiting settlers for the region they had "purchased". In 1776, the Virginia General Assembly prohibited further settlement, and in 1778, declared the Transylvania compact void.

== Revolutionary War phase: Cherokee War of 1776 ==
During the Revolutionary War, the Cherokee not only fought against the settlers in the Overmountain region, and later in the Cumberland Basin, defending against territorial settlements, they also fought as allies of Great Britain against American patriots. British strategy was focused on the North, and not so much on the backwoods settlements, especially those in the west. The Cherokee, therefore, were on their own, except for supplies from British ports on the coast and some joint operations in South Carolina.

=== Flight of the Loyalists ===
As tensions rose, Loyalist John Stuart, British Superintendent of Indian Affairs, was besieged by a mob at his house in Charleston and had to flee for his life. His first stop was St. Augustine in East Florida.

Another noted Loyalist later associated with the Cherokee, Thomas Brown, was not nearly so fortunate. In his home of Brownsborough, Georgia, near Augusta, he was assaulted by a crowd of the Sons of Liberty, tied to a tree, roasted with fire, scalped, tarred, and feathered. After his escape, he took up residence among the Seminole commanding his East Florida Rangers, who fought with them and some of the Lower Muskogee.

From St. Augustine, Stuart sent his deputy, Alexander Cameron, and his brother Henry to Mobile to obtain short-term supplies and arms for the Cherokee. Dragging Canoe took a party of 80 warriors to provide security for the pack train. He met Henry Stuart and Cameron (whom he had adopted as a brother) at Mobile on March 1, 1776. He asked how he could help the British against their rebel subjects, and for help with the illegal settlers. The two men told him to wait for regular troops to arrive before taking any action.

When the two arrived at Chota, Henry Stuart sent out letters to the frontier settlers. He informed them that they were illegally on Cherokee land and gave them 40 days to leave. In an exercise of propaganda, people sympathetic to the Revolution forged a letter to indicate a large force of regular troops, plus Chickasaw, Choctaw, and Muscogee, was on the march from Pensacola and planning to pick up reinforcements from the Cherokee. The forged letters alarmed the settlers, who began gathering together in closer, fortified groups, building stations (small forts), and otherwise preparing for an attack.

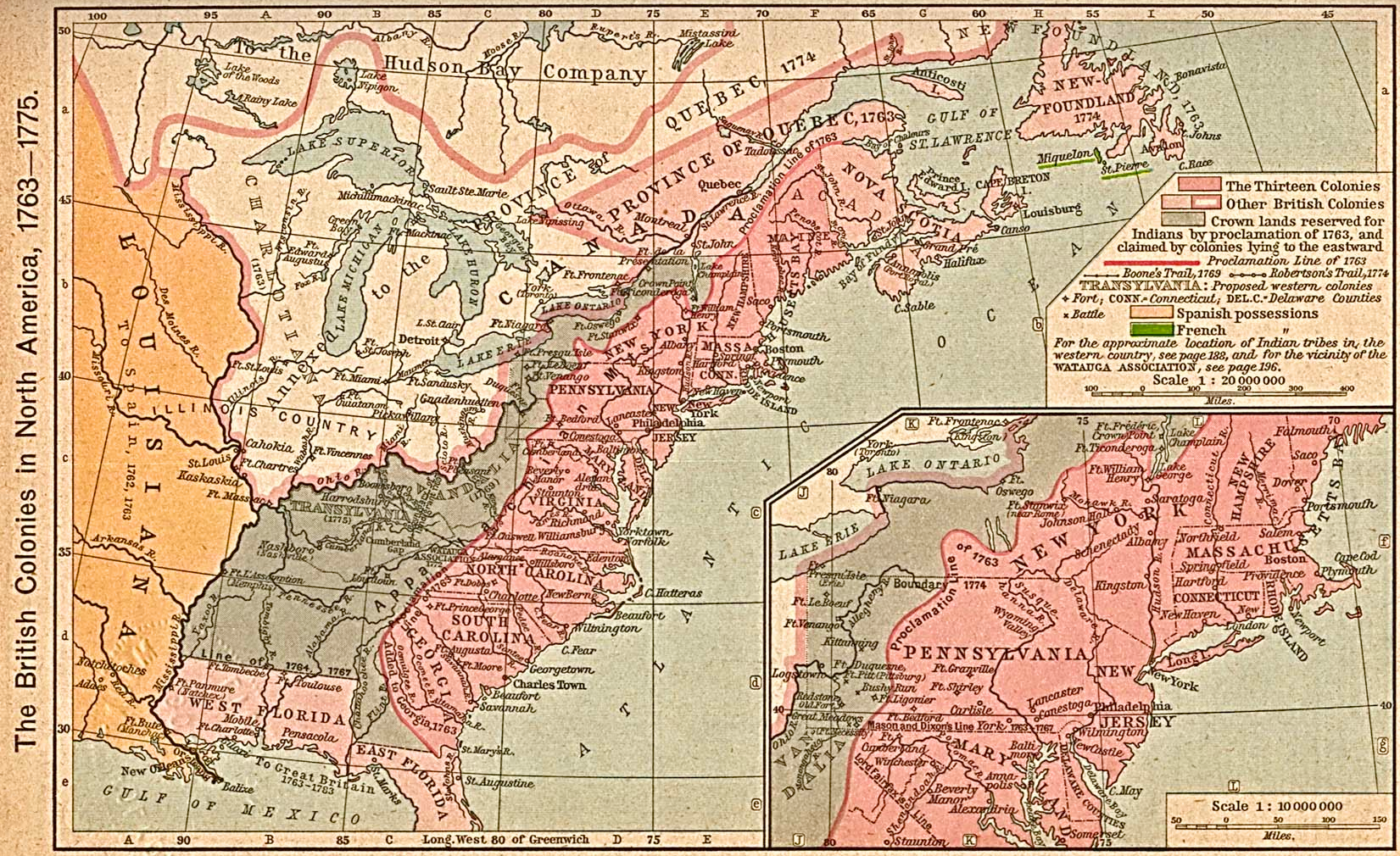
The British colonies in North America at the outbreak of the Revolution in 1775, including the locations of the proposed colonies of Charlotiana, Transylvania, and Vandalia

=== Visit from the northern tribes ===
In May 1776, partly at the behest of Henry Hamilton, the British governor in Detroit, the Shawnee chief Cornstalk led a delegation from the northern tribes (Shawnee, Lenape, Iroquois, Ottawa and others) to the southern tribes. He traveled to Chota to meet with the southern tribes (Cherokee, Muscogee, Chickasaw, Choctaw) about fighting with the British against their common enemy. Cornstalk called for united action against those they called the "Long Knives", the squatters who settled and remained in Kain-tuck-ee, or, as the settlers called it, Transylvania. At the close of his speech, Cornstalk offered his war belt, and Dragging Canoe accepted it. Dragging Canoe also accepted belts from the Ottawa and the Iroquois.

To prepare themselves for the coming campaign, the Overhill Cherokee began raiding into Kentucky, often with the Shawnee. Before the northern delegation had left, Dragging Canoe led a small war party into Kentucky and returned with four scalps to present to Cornstalk before they departed. In another raid, a war party led by Hanging Maw, captured three teenage settler girls, Jemima Boone and Elizabeth and Frances Callaway, on July 14 but lost them three days later to a rescue party led by Daniel Boone, father of Jemima, and Richard Callaway, father of Elizabeth and Frances.

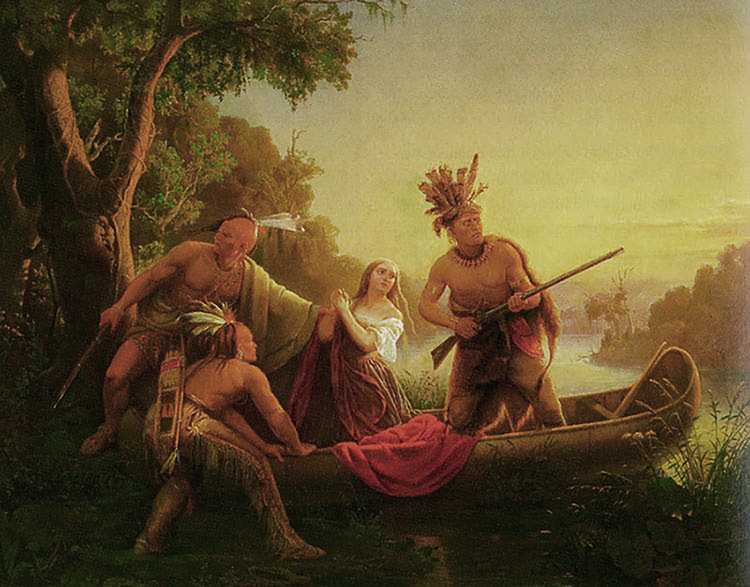
Artist's impression of the capture of Jemima Boone by Cherokee Indians in 1776, painted by German-American artist Charles Ferdinand Wimar in 1853.

=== First Cherokee campaigns ===
In late June 1776, war parties from the Lower Towns began attacking the frontier of South Carolina. On July 1, the Out, Middle, and Valley Towns sent out war parties raiding the frontiers settlements of North Carolina east of the Blue Ridge coming down the Catawba River. Meanwhile, traders warned the Overmountain settlers of the impending attacks from the Overhill Towns. They had come from Chota bearing word from Nancy Ward, the Beloved Woman (leader or Elder). The Cherokee offensive proved to be disastrous for the attackers.

On July 3, a small war party of Cherokee besieged a small fort on the North Carolina frontier. The garrison managed to keep from being overrun until a large body of militia arrived in the rear of besiegers, who then retreated.

A 190-strong war party of Cherokee and Loyalist partisans dressed as Cherokee attacked the large fort on the South Carolina frontier known as Lindley's Station. Its 150-man Patriot garrison had just finished building it the day before. After repulsing the attack, the Patriots gave chase, killing two Loyalists and capturing ten, but inflicting no casualties on the Cherokee.

Dragging Canoe's forces advanced up the Great Indian Warpath and had a small skirmish with a body of militia numbering twenty who quickly withdrew. Pursuing them and intending to take Fort Lee at Long-Island-on-the-Holston, his force advanced toward the island. However, on July 20, it encountered a larger force of militia six miles from their target, about half the size of his own but desperate, in a stronger position than the small group before. During the "Battle of Island Flats" which followed, Dragging Canoe was wounded in his hip by a musket ball, and his brother Little Owl incredibly survived after being hit eleven times. His force then withdrew, raiding isolated cabins on the way and returned to the Overhill area with plunder and scalps, after raiding further north into southwestern Virginia.

On July 21, Abraham of Chilhowee led his party in attempting to capture Fort Caswell on the Watauga, but his attack was driven off with heavy casualties. Instead of withdrawing, however, he put the garrison under siege, a tactic which had worked well the previous decade with Fort Loudon. After two weeks, though, he and his warriors gave that up. Savanukah's party raided from the outskirts of Carter's Valley far into the Clinch River Valley in Virginia, but those targets contained only small settlements and isolated farmsteads, so he did no real military damage.

=== Colonial response ===
The affected colonies of Virginia, North Carolina, South Carolina, and Georgia conferred and concluded that swift, massive retaliation was the only way to preserve peace on the frontier. Colonial militia then retaliated against the Cherokee. North Carolina sent Griffith Rutherford with 2,400 militia to scour the Oconaluftee and Tuckasegee river valleys, as well as the headwaters of the Little Tennessee and Hiwassee rivers. South Carolina sent 1,800 men to the Savannah, and Georgia sent 200 to attack Cherokee settlements along the Chattahoochee and Tugaloo rivers.

Not long after leaving Fort McGahey on July 23, Rutherford's militia, accompanied by a large contingent of Catawba warriors, encountered an ambush by the Cherokee at the Battle of Cowee Gap in what is now western North Carolina. After defeating the attackers, he proceeded to a designated rendezvous with the South Carolina militia.

On August 1, Cameron and the Cherokee ambushed Andrew Williamson and his South Carolina militia force near the Lower Cherokee town of Isunigu known to whites as Seneca, in the Battle of Twelve Mile Creek. The South Carolina Militia retreated and later joined up with the militia force of Andrew Pickens. The next day, August 2, the joint militia force bivouacked, and Pickens led a party of 25 to forage for food and firewood. In what is known as the Ring Fight, 200 Cherokee surrounded and attacked the party, which withdrew into a ring and were able to hold their attackers at bay until reinforcements arrived. Pickens and his militia defeated the Cherokee on the Tugaloo River in the Battle of Tugaloo, which they then burned on August 10. On August 12, Williamson and Pickens defeated the Cherokee at the Battle of Tamassee. With this, they had completed their destruction of the Lower Towns, Keowee, Estatoe, Seneca, and the rest. Afterwards, they proceeded north to meet up with the North Carolina militia of Griffith Rutherford.

Rutherford's militia traversed Swannanoa Gap in the Blue Ridge on September 1, and reached the outskirts of the Out, Valley, and Middle Towns on September 14, at which they started burning towns and crops. Williamson's militia were attacked at the Battle of Black Hole near Franklin, North Carolina on September 19 but were able to fend off the Cherokee and meet up with Rutherford. In all, Williamson, Pickens, and Rutherford destroyed more than 50 towns, burned the houses and food stores, destroyed the orchards, slaughtered livestock, and killed hundreds of Cherokee. They sold captives into slavery, and these were often transported to the Caribbean.

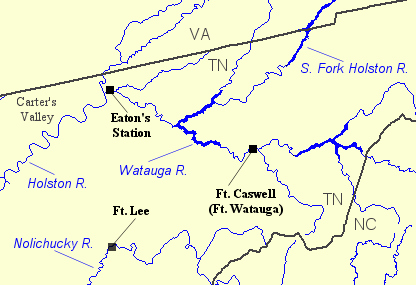
Map of the Cherokee invasion of the Washington District, Pendleton District, and Carter's Valley

In the meantime, the Continental Army sent Col. William Christian to the lower Little Tennessee Valley with a battalion of Continentals, 500 Virginia militia, 300 North Carolina militia, and 300 rangers. Upon reaching the Little Tennessee in late October, Christian's Virginia force found those towns from whence the militant attackers had sprung—Great Island, Citico (Sitiku), Toqua (Dakwayi), Tuskegee (Taskigi), Chilhowee, and Great Tellico—not only deserted but burned to the ground by their own former inhabitants, along with all the food and stores that could not be carried away.

=== Migration to Chickamauga ===
Oconostota supported making peace with the colonists. Dragging Canoe called for the women, children, and old to be sent below the Hiwassee and for the warriors to burn the towns, then ambush the Virginians at the French Broad River. Oconostota, Attakullakulla, and the older chiefs decided against that plan. Oconostota sent word to the approaching colonial army, offering to exchange Dragging Canoe and Cameron if the Overhill Towns were spared.

Dragging Canoe spoke to the council of the Overhill Towns, denouncing the older leaders as rogues and "Virginians" for their willingness to cede land for an ephemeral safety. He concluded, "As for me, I have my young warriors about me. We will have our lands." Afterward, he and other militant leaders, including Ostenaco, gathered like-minded Cherokee from the Overhill, Valley, and Hill towns, and migrated to what is now the Chattanooga, Tennessee area, where the Cisca and St. Augustine Trail crossed the Chickamauga River (South Chickamauga Creek). Since Dragging Canoe made that town his seat of operations, frontier Americans called his faction the "Chickamaugas". Other Cherokee refugees turned up in Pensacola and wintered there.

John McDonald already had a trading post across the Chickamauga River. This provided a link to Henry Stuart, brother of John, in the West Florida capital of Pensacola. Cameron, the British deputy Indian superintendent, accompanied Dragging Canoe to Chickamauga. Nearly all the whites legally resident among the Cherokee were part of the related exodus.

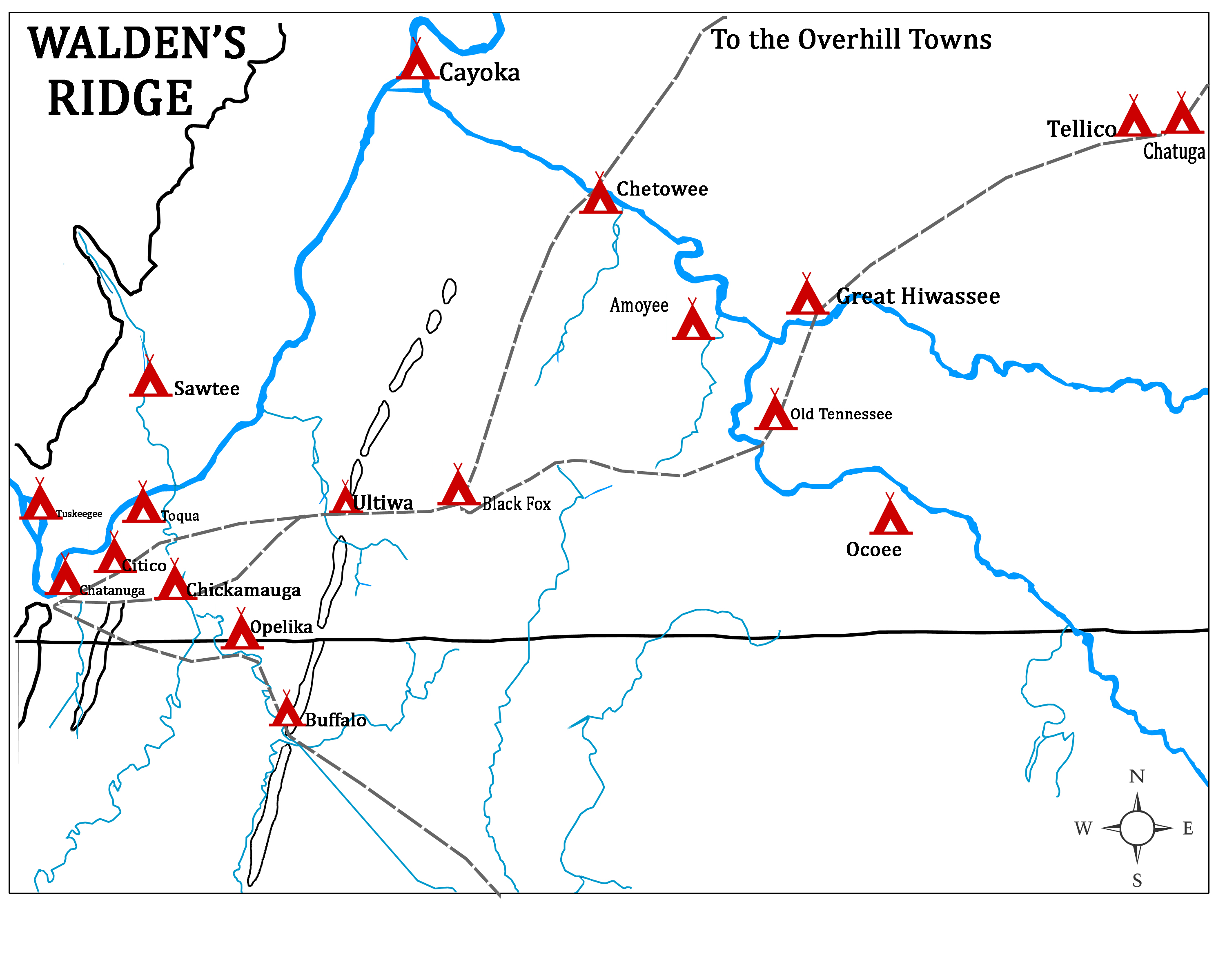
The eleven towns in the Chickamauga area, along with the Hiwassee towns and the towns on the Tellico

In March 1777, Cameron sent the refugees to Chickamauga along with a sizable amount of goods. The colonials learned of the materiel and planned to intercept it. When Cameron informed him of the danger, Emistisigua, Paramount Chief of the Upper Muscogee, sent a force of 350 warriors to guard them as well as to assist in rebuilding and waging war.

=== Treaties of 1777 ===
Preliminary negotiations between the Overhill Towns and Virginia were held at Fort Patrick Henry in April 1777. Nathaniel Gist, later father of Sequoyah, led the talks for Virginia, while Attakullakulla, Oconostota, and Savanukah headed the delegation of Cherokee.

The Cherokee signed the Treaty of Dewitt's Corner with Georgia and South Carolina on May 20 and the Treaty of Fort Henry, also known as the Avery Treaty, with Virginia and North Carolina on July 20. They promised to stop warring, with those colonies promising in return to protect them from attack. In the Treaty of Dewitt's Corner, the Lower Towns ceded all their land in modern South Carolina except for a small strip in what is now Oconee County. One provision of the Treaty of Fort Henry required that James Robertson and a small garrison be quartered at Chota on the Little Tennessee. He had been appointed Superintendent of Indian Affairs for North Carolina, while Joseph Martin had been appointed Superintendent of Indian Affairs for Virginia.

=== Targets of the Cherokee ===
From their new bases, the Cherokee conducted raids against settlers on the Holston, Doe, Watauga, and Nolichucky rivers, on the Cumberland and Red rivers, and those in the isolated frontier stations in between. The Cherokee ambushed parties traveling on the Tennessee River, and on local sections of the many ancient trails that served as "highways", such as the Great Indian Warpath (Mobile to northeast Canada), the Cisca and St. Augustine Trail (St. Augustine to the French Salt Lick at Nashville), the Cumberland Trail (from the Upper Creek Path to the Great Lakes), and the Nickajack Trail (Nickajack to Augusta). Later, the Cherokee stalked the Natchez Trace and roads improved by the uninvited settlers, such as the Kentucky, Cumberland, and Walton roads. Occasionally, the Cherokee attacked targets in Virginia, the Carolinas, Georgia, Kentucky, and the Ohio country.

In contempt of the peace proceedings at Fort Henry in April 1777, Dragging Canoe led a war party that killed a settler named Frederick Calvitt and stole 15 horses from James Robertson, then moved to Carter's Valley, killing the grandparents of David Crockett along with several children near the modern Rogersville, and marauding across the valley. In all the raiders took twelve scalps.

In summer 1777, Deputy Superintendents Cameron and Taitt led a large contingent of Cherokee and Muscogee warriors against the back country settlements of the Carolinas and Georgia. The Cherokee established a camp at the confluence of the Tennessee and Ohio Rivers (near present-day Paducah, Kentucky) to prevent infiltration into the Mississippi in the spring of 1778.

== Revolutionary War phase: Southern strategy (1778–1783) ==
In late 1778, British strategy shifted south. As their attention went, so too did their efforts, their armies, and their supplies, including those slated for the Southern Indians. The Southern theater had the added advantage of being home to more Loyalists than the North. With all these new advantages, the Cherokee were able to greatly renew their territorial defense. Both the Cherokee and the Upper Creek signed on for active participation.

=== British victory in the North ===
On December 17, 1778, Henry Hamilton captured Fort Vincennes and used it as a base to plan a spring offensive against George Rogers Clark, whose forces had recently seized control of much of the Illinois Country. His plans were to assemble 500 warriors from various Indian nations, including the Cherokee, the Chickasaw, the Shawnee, and others, for a campaign to expel Clark's forces back east, then drive through Kentucky clearing American settlements. McDonald's headquarters at Chickamauga was to be the staging ground and commissary for the Cherokee and the Muscogee. Clark recaptured Fort Vincennes, and Hamilton along with it, on February 25, 1779, after the Siege of Fort Vincennes. The Chickamauga Cherokee turned their sights to the northeast.

=== Battles in the Deep South ===
The British captured Savannah on December 29, 1778, with help from Dragging Canoe, John McDonald, and the Cherokee, along with McGillivray's Upper Muscogee force and McIntosh's band of Hitichiti warriors. Just over a month later, January 31, 1779, they captured Augusta, Georgia, as well, though they quickly had to retreat. With these victories, the remaining neutral towns of the Lower Muscogee threw in their lot with the British side. Thomas Brown of the King's Carolina Rangers was assigned to the Atlantic District to work with the Cherokee, Muscogee, and Seminole.

Charlestown was captured on May 12, 1780, after a siege that began March 29. Along with it, the British took prisoner some 3,000 Patriots, including South Carolina militia leader Andrew Williamson. Upon giving his parole that he would not again take up arms, Williamson became a double agent for the Patriots, according to testimony after the war by Patriot General Nathanael Greene.

=== Fort Nashborough ===
In early 1779, Robertson and John Donelson traveled overland along the Kentucky Road and founded Fort Nashborough on the Cumberland River in what later became Tennessee. It was the first of many such settlements in the Cumberland area, which subsequently became the focus of attacks by all the tribes in the surrounding region. Leaving a small group there, both returned east. In autumn 1779, Robertson and a group of fellow Wataugans left the east down the Kentucky Road headed for Fort Nashborough. They arrived on Christmas Day 1779 without incident.

Donelson journeyed down the Tennessee River with a party that included his family, intending to go across to the mouth of the Cumberland, then upriver to Fort Nashborough. They departed the East Tennessee settlements on February 27, 1780. Eventually, the group did reach its destination, but only after being ambushed several times. In the first encounter near Tuskegee Island on March 7, the Cherokee warriors under Bloody Fellow attacked the boat in the rear. Its passengers had come down with smallpox. They took as captive the one survivor, who was later ransomed by American colonists. The victory proved to be a pyrrhic one for the Cherokee, a smallpox epidemic spread among its people, killing several hundred in the vicinity. Several miles downriver, beginning with the obstruction known as the Suck or the Kettle, the party was fired upon throughout their passage through the Tennessee River Gorge (Cash Canyon); one person died and several were wounded. At Muscle Shoals, the Donelson party was attacked by Muscogee and Chickasaw, up into Hardin County, Tennessee. The Donelson party reached its destination on April 24, 1780. The group included John's daughter Rachel, the future wife of future U.S. Representative, Senator, and President Andrew Jackson, who fought a duel in her honor in 1806. Shortly after his party's arrival at Fort Nashborough, Donelson along with Robertson and others formed the Cumberland Compact.

=== Overmountain theatre ===
Robertson heard warning from Chota that Dragging Canoe's warriors were going to attack the Holston area. In addition, he had received intelligence that McDonald's place was the staging area for the northern campaign that Hamilton had been planning to conduct, and that a stockpile of supplies equivalent to that of 100 packhorses was stored there. Small parties of Cherokee began repeated small raids on the Holston frontier shortly thereafter.

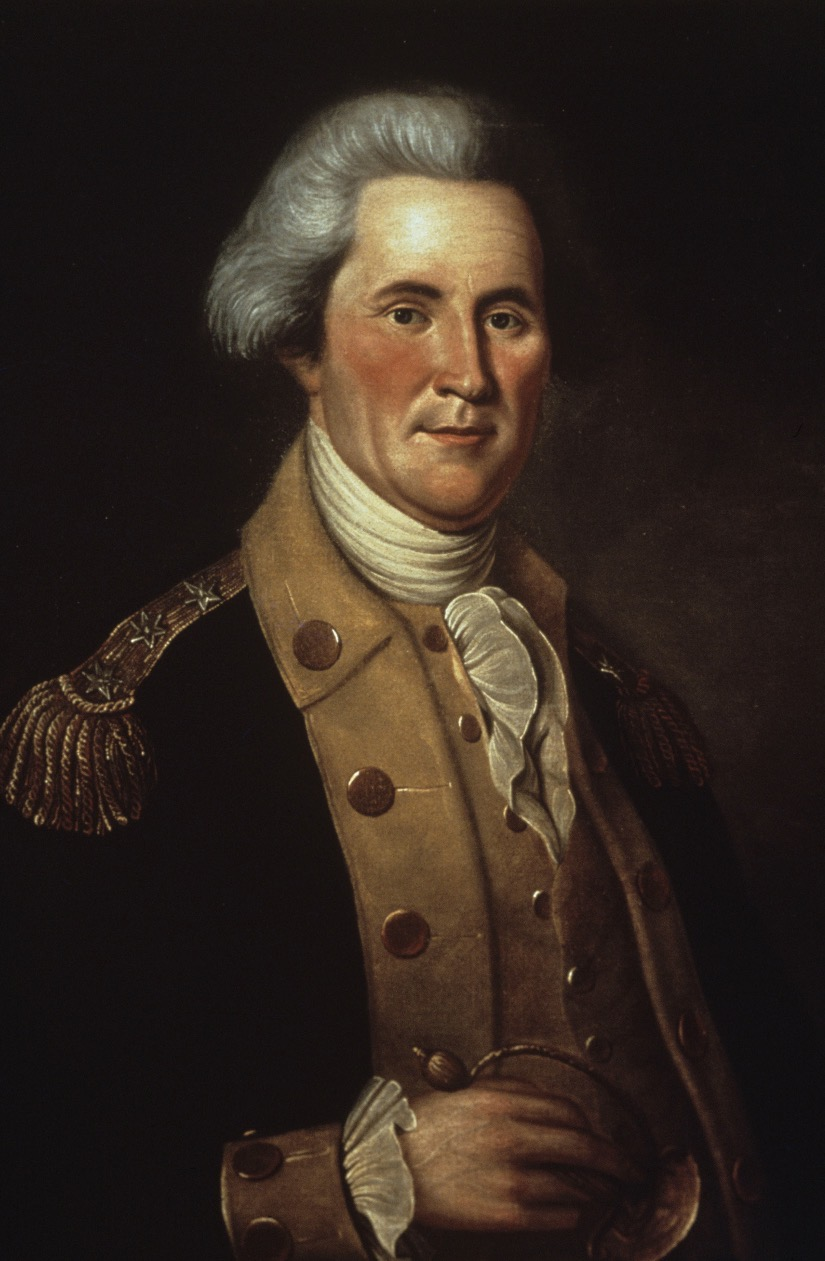
Cropped portrait of John Sevier in military uniform, painted in 1792 by Charles Willson Peale.

In the summer of 1780, Thomas Brown planned to have a joint conference between the Cherokee and Muscogee to plan ways to coordinate their attacks, but those plans were forestalled when Georgians under Elijah Clarke made a concerted effort to retake Augusta in September, where he had his headquarters. His King's Carolina Rangers and 50 Muscogee warriors formed the entire garrison against Clarke's 700 fighters.

The arrival of a sizable war party from the Chickamauga and Overhill Towns and a force from Fort Ninety-Six in South Carolina prevented the capture of both, and the Cherokee and Brown's rangers chased Elijah Clarke's army into the arms of John Sevier, wreaking havoc on rebellious settlements along the way. This set the stage for the Battle of Kings Mountain October 7, 1780, in which Loyalist militia American Volunteers under Patrick Ferguson moved south trying to encircle Clarke; they were defeated by a force of 900 frontiersmen under Sevier and William Campbell, who were referred to as the Overmountain Men.

Brown, aware that nearly 1,000 men were away from the American settlements with the militias, urged Dragging Canoe and other Cherokee leaders to strike while they had the opportunity. Under the influence of Savanukah, the Overhill Towns gave their full support to the new offensive. Both Brown and the Cherokee had been expecting a quick victory by Patrick Ferguson and were stunned that he suffered such a resounding defeat so soon. But their planned assault on the settlements was in motion. Learning of the new invasion from Nancy Ward (her second documented betrayal of Dragging Canoe), Virginia Governor Thomas Jefferson sent an expedition of 700 Virginians and North Carolinians against the Cherokee in December 1780, under the command of Sevier. The expedition routed a Cherokee war party at the Battle of Boyd's Creek on December 16.

After that battle, Sevier's army was joined by forces under Arthur Campbell and Joseph Martin. The combined force marched against the Overhill towns on the Little Tennessee and the Hiwassee, burning seventeen of them, including Chota, Chilhowee, the original Citico, Tellico, Great Hiwassee, and Chestowee, finishing up on January 1, 1781. Afterwards, the Overhill leaders withdrew from further active conflict for a time, though warriors from the Middle and Valley Towns continued to harass colonists on the frontier.

Not long after returning home from his destruction of the Overhill towns, Sevier had received word that the warriors from the Middle Towns were bent on revenge. At the beginning of March, Sevier raised a force for a campaign against the Middle and Out Towns east of the mountains. Beginning at Tuckasegee and ending at Cowee, they burned 15 towns, killed 29 Cherokee, and took 9 prisoners.

While Dragging Canoe and his warriors turned their attentions to the Cumberland, the Shawnee began raiding settlements in Upper East Tennessee and Southwest Virginia, the latter by now having become Washington County. In particular they targeted those along the Clinch and Holston Rivers and in Powell's Valley. These Shawnee came down from their homes on the Ohio River by way of the Warriors' Path through the Cumberland Gap. Their attacks continued, along with occasional forays by McGillivray's Upper Muscogee, even after sporadic raids by the Cherokee renewed, until they began to focus all their attention on the Northwest Indian War.

In midsummer 1781, a party of Cherokee came west over the mountains and began raiding the new settlements on the French Broad River. Sevier raised a force of 150 and attacked their camp on Indian Creek.

On July 26, 1781, the Overhill Towns signed the second Treaty of Long-Island-on-the-Holston, this time directly with the Overmountain settlements. In response to incursions by new settlers beyond the limits of the treaties, warriors from the Chickamauga Towns began harassing the Holston frontier in the spring and summer of 1782. In September, an expedition under Sevier once again destroyed many of the towns in the Chickamauga vicinity, and those Cherokee of the former Lower Towns now in North Georgia, from Buffalo Town at the modern Ringgold, Georgia south to Ustanali (Ustanalahi) near modern Calhoun, Georgia, including what he called Vann's Town, as well as Ellijay and Coosawattee. Most of the towns were deserted because having advance warning of the impending attack, Dragging Canoe and his fellow leaders chose relocation westward. Meanwhile, Sevier's army, guided by John Watts, somehow never managed to cross paths with any parties of Cherokee.

=== Attacks at Chickamauga ===
At the beginning of April 1779, a group of 300 Cherokee and 50 Loyalist Rangers under Walter Scott, left the Chickamauga Towns headed for a marauding campaign against the frontier settlements in Georgia and South Carolina. Hearing of their departure, Joseph Martin, Indian agent for the Americans at Chota, sent word to Governor Patrick Henry of their absence.

The state governments of Virginia and North Carolina made a joint decision to send an expedition against the Chickamauga Towns, who were thought to be responsible for the raids. Most of those warriors, however, were in South Carolina with Cameron and Dragging Canoe. A thousand Overmountain men under Evan Shelby (father of Isaac Shelby, first governor of the State of Kentucky) and a regiment of Continentals under John Montgomery disembarked on April 10, boating down the Tennessee in a fleet of dugout canoes. They arrived in the Chickamauga towns ten days later. For the next two weeks, they destroyed the eleven towns in the immediate area, and most of the food supply, along with McDonald's home, store, and commissary. Because the warriors were on a campaign in Georgia and South Carolina, there was no resistance and only four deaths among the inhabitants. Whatever was not destroyed was confiscated and sold at what became known as Sale Creek.

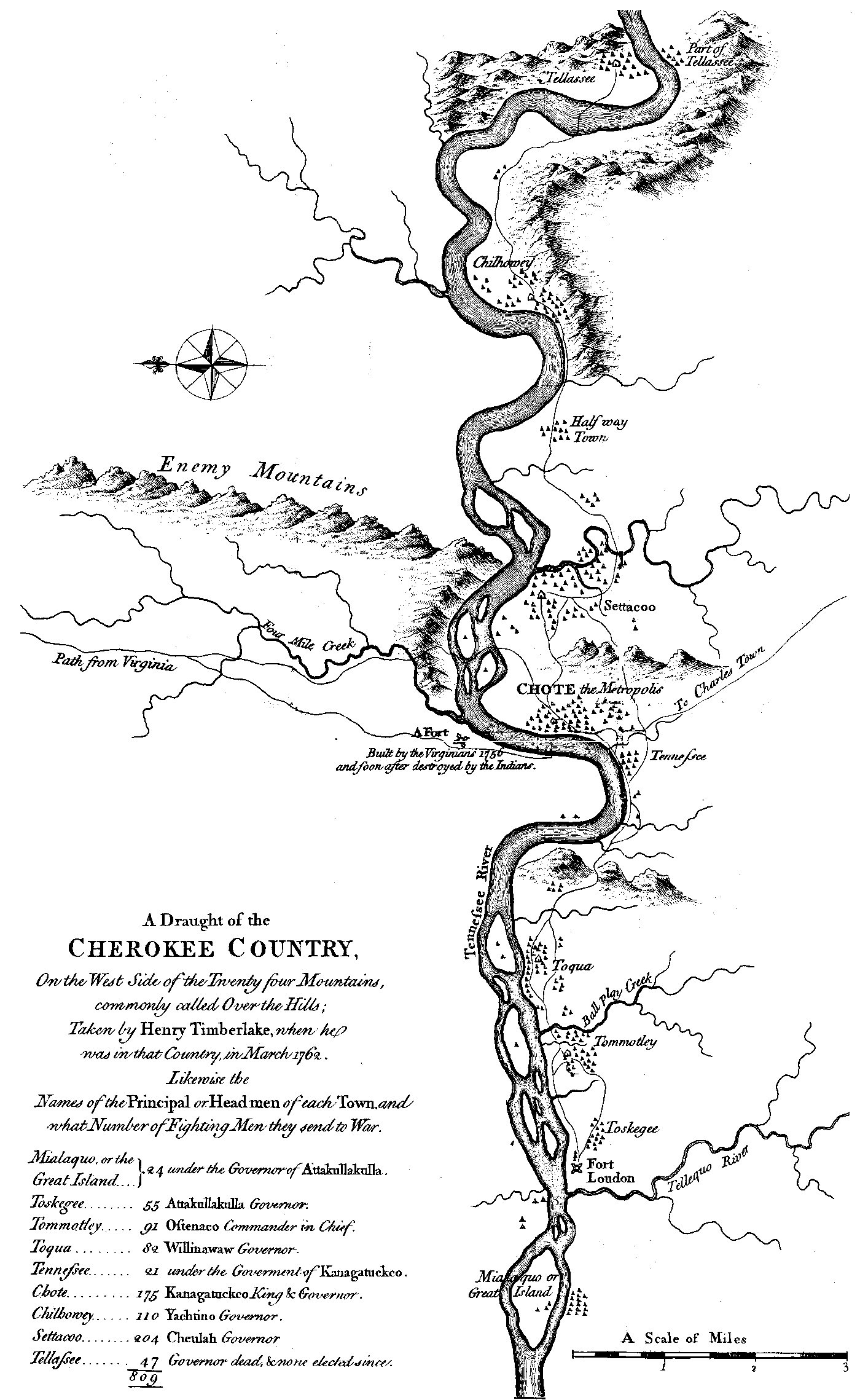
Timberlake's "Draught of the Cherokee Country", showing the location of the Overhill towns on the Little Tennessee River (labeled Tennessee River on the map)

Upon hearing of the devastation of the towns and loss of all their stores, Dragging Canoe, McDonald, and their men, including the Rangers, returned to Chickamauga and its vicinity. The Shawnee sent envoys to Chickamauga to find out if the destruction had caused Dragging Canoe's people to lose the will to fight, along with a sizable detachment of warriors to assist them. In response to their inquiries, Dragging Canoe held up the war belts he had accepted when the delegation visited Chota in 1776, and said, "We are not yet conquered". To cement the alliance, the Cherokee responded to the Shawnee gesture by sending nearly 100 warriors north. The towns in the Chickamauga area were rebuilt. Dragging Canoe responded to the Shelby expedition with punitive raids on the frontiers of both North Carolina and Virginia.

In midsummer 1779, Cameron arrived at Chickamauga with a company of Loyalist Refugees and convinced the Cherokee to join them on their march to South Carolina. Three hundred took up arms and headed out to maraud the backcountry of Georgia and South Carolina. Later in October, Andrew Williamson's South Carolina militia responded by attacking several towns on the eastern frontier of Cherokee territory and burning their foodstores.

=== Chickasaw-American war ===
The Chickasaw transformed from river sentries into attacking warriors in June 1780 when George Rogers Clark and a party of over 500, including some Kaskaskia of the Illinois Confederation, built Fort Jefferson and the surrounding settlement of Clarksville near the mouth of the Ohio, inside their hunting grounds. The building had begun in April and finished before the first attack on June 7.

After learning of the trespass, the Chickasaw destroyed the settlement, laid siege to the fort, and began attacking settlers on the Kentucky frontier. They continued attacking the Cumberland and into Kentucky through early the following year. Their last raid was in conjunction with Dragging Canoe's Cherokee, upon Freeland's Station on the Cumberland on January 11, 1781.

Three months after the first Chickasaw attack on the Cumberland, on April 2, 1781, the Cherokee launched their largest campaign of the wars against those settlements. This culminated in what became known as the Battle of the Bluff, led by Dragging Canoe. It lasted through to the next day and was the last attack of this war. Afterward, settlers began to abandon these frontier settlements until only three stations were left, a condition which lasted until 1785.

=== Lenape refugees ===
While the Middle Towns warriors kept the Overmountain Men busy, the Chickamauga Towns welcomed Lenape warriors who were seeking refuge from the fighting in the Illinois and Ohio Countries. They settled permanently there who brought their families.

=== Politics in the Overhill Towns ===
In the fall of 1781, the British engineered a coup d'état of sorts that put Savanukah as First Beloved Man in place of the more pacifist Oconostota, who succeeded Attakullakulla. For the next two years, the Overhill Cherokee openly, as they had been doing covertly, supported the efforts of Dragging Canoe and his militant Cherokee.

=== Death of Alexander Cameron ===
On December 27, 1781, Alexander Cameron, British Superintendent of Indian Affairs for the Mississippi District, blood brother to Dragging Canoe, and friend to all Cherokee, died in Savannah. He was replaced by John Graham.

=== Diplomatic mission to Fort St. Louis ===
A party of Cherokee joined the Lenape, Shawnee, and Chickasaw in a diplomatic visit to the Spanish at Fort St. Louis in the Missouri country in March 1782 seeking a new avenue of obtaining arms and other assistance in the prosecution of their ongoing conflict with the Americans in the Ohio Valley. One group of Cherokee at this meeting led by Standing Turkey (Conocotocko) sought and received permission to settle in Spanish Louisiana, in the region of the White River.

=== Migration to the Lower Towns ===
Upon finishing their move, Dragging Canoe and his people established what whites called the Five Lower Towns downriver from the various natural obstructions in the 26-mile Tennessee River Gorge, known locally as Cash Canyon. Starting with Tuskegee (aka Brown's or Williams') Island and the sandbars on either side of it, these obstructions included the Tumbling Shoals, the Holston Rock, the Kettle (or Suck), the Suck Shoals, the Deadman's Eddy, the Pot, the Skillet, the Pan, and, finally, the Narrows, ending with Hale's Bar. The whole 26 miles was sometimes called The Suck, and the stretch of river was notorious enough to merit mention even by Thomas Jefferson. These navigational hazards were so formidable, in fact, that the French agents attempting to travel upriver to reach Cherokee country during the French and Indian War, intending to establish an outpost at the spot later occupied by British agent McDonald, gave up after several attempts.

The Five Lower Towns included Running Water (Amogayunyi), at the current Whiteside in Marion County, Tennessee, where Dragging Canoe made his headquarters; Nickajack (Ani-Kusati-yi, or Koasati place), eight kilometers down the Tennessee River; Long Island (Amoyeligunahita), on the Tennessee just above the Great Creek Crossing; Crow Town (Kagunyi) on the Tennessee, at the mouth of Crow Creek; and Stecoyee (Utsutigwayi, Lookout Mountain Town), at the current site of Trenton, Georgia. Tuskegee Island Town was reoccupied as a lookout post by a small band of warriors to provide advance warning of invasions, and eventually many other settlements in the area were resettled as well.

Because this was a move into the outskirts of Muscogee territory, Dragging Canoe, knowing such a move might be necessary, had previously sent a delegation under Little Owl to meet with Alex McGillivray, the major Muscogee leader in the area, to gain their permission. When the Cherokee moved their base, so too did John McDonald, now deputy to Thomas Brown, along with his own assistant Daniel Ross, making Running Water the base of operations. Graham's deputy, Alexander Campbell, set up his own base at what became Turkeytown.

Cherokee continued to migrate westward to join Dragging Canoe's militant band. Many in this influx were Cherokee from North Georgia, who fled the depredations of expeditions such as those of Sevier; a large majority of these were former inhabitants of the original Lower Towns. Cherokee from the Middle, or Hill, Towns also came, a group of whom established a town named Sawtee (Itsati) at the mouth of South Sauta Creek on the Tennessee.

Later major settlements included Willstown (Titsohiliyi) near the later Fort Payne; Turkeytown (Gundigaduhunyi), at the head of the Cumberland Trail where the Upper Creek Path crossed the Coosa River near Centre, Alabama; Creek Path (Kusanunnahiyi), near at the intersection of the Great Indian Warpath with the Upper Creek Path at the modern Guntersville, Alabama; Turnip Town (Ulunyi), 7 miles from the present-day Rome, Georgia; and Chatuga (Tsatugi), nearer the site of Rome.

Partly because of the large influx from North Georgia added to the fact that they were no longer occupying the Chickamauga area as their main center, Dragging Canoe's followers and others in the area began to be referred to as the Lower Cherokee. The ranks of these new Lower Cherokee were further swelled by runaway slaves, white Tories, Muscogee, Yuchi, Natchez, and Shawnee, plus a few Spanish, French, Irish, and Germans. The town Coosada came into the coalition when its Koasati and Kaskinampo inhabitants joined Dragging Canoe's coalition. The band of Chickasaw living at Ditto's Landing south of Huntsville, Alabama, also joined the coalition. The rest of the Chickasaw, however, were trying to play the Americans and the Spanish against each other with no interest in the British.

=== Cherokees to the North ===
In November 1782, twenty representatives from four northern tribes—Wyandot, Ojibwa, Ottawa, and Potowatami—traveled south to consult with Dragging Canoe and his lieutenants at his new headquarters in Running Water Town, which was nestled far back up the hollow from the Tennessee River onto which it opened. Their mission was to gain the help of Dragging Canoe's Cherokee in attacking Pittsburgh and the American settlements in Kentucky and the Illinois country. When the party returned north, Turtle-at-Home, brother of Dragging Canoe, took 70 warriors north to fight alongside the Shawnee.

At the beginning of 1783, there were at least three major communities of Cherokee in the region. One lived among the Chalahgawtha (Chillicothe) Shawnee. The second Cherokee community lived among the mixed Wyandot-Mingo towns on the upper Mad River near the later Zanesfield, Ohio. A third group of Cherokee is known to have lived among and fought with the Munsee-Lenape, the only portion of the Lenape nation at war with the Americans. Though filled by different warriors shifted back and forth, these three bands remained in the northwest until after the Treaty of Greenville in 1795.

=== Georgia Indian war of 1782 ===
At the end of 1781, the Cherokee invaded Georgia once again with a group of Muscogee, this time being met by South Carolina and Georgia troops under Andrew Pickens and Elijah Clarke at the Oconee River after much back country raiding. Evading the American force, the Cherokee withdrew, adopting a scorched earth strategy to deny their foes supplies. The force eventually retreated, opening the back country to further raids.

By the fall of 1782, Lt. Col. Thomas Waters of the Loyalist Rangers, formerly stationed at Fort Ninety-Six in South Carolina, had retreated to the frontier of Cherokee-Muscogee territory just outside Georgia. From his base at the mouth of Long Swamp Creek on Etowah River, he and his remaining rangers, in conjunction with Cherokee and Muscogee warriors, ravaged backwoods homesteads and settlements.

The states of South Carolina and Georgia sent out a joint expedition led by Andrew Pickens and Elijah Clarke to put an end to his insurgency. Leaving September 16, they invaded that section of the country, ranging at least as far as Ustanali, where they took prisoners. In all they destroyed thirteen towns and villages. By October 22, Waters and his men had escaped and the Cherokee sued for peace.

=== St. Augustine conference ===
In January 1783, Dragging Canoe and 1,200 Cherokee traveled to St. Augustine, the capital of East Florida, for a summit meeting with a delegation of western tribes (Shawnee, Muscogee, Mohawk, Seneca, Lenape, Mingo, Tuscarora, and Choctaw) called for a federation of Indians to oppose the Americans and their frontier colonists. Brown, the British Indian Superintendent, approved the concept.

At Tuckabatchee a few months later, a general council of the major southern tribes (Cherokee, Muscogee, Chickasaw, Choctaw, and Seminole) plus representatives of smaller groups (Mobile, Catawba, Biloxi, Huoma, etc.) took place to follow up, but plans for the federation were cut short by the signing of the Treaty of Paris. Signed May 30, 1783, the treaty confirmed the northern boundary between the State of Georgia and the Cherokee, with the Cherokee ceding large amounts of land between the Savannah and Chattachoochee Rivers.

=== Overhill politics ===
In the fall of 1783, the older pacifist leaders replaced Savanukah with another of their number, Corntassel (Kaiyatsatahi, known to history as "Old Tassel"), and sent messages of peace along with complaints of settler encroachment to Virginia and North Carolina. Opposition from pacifist leaders, however, never stopped war parties from traversing the territories of any of the town groups, largely because the average Cherokee supported their cause, nor did it stop small war parties of the Overhill Towns from raiding settlements in East Tennessee, mostly those on the Holston.

=== Treaty of Paris (1783) ===
Signed between Great Britain and the United States on September 3, 1783, the Treaty of Paris treaty formally ended the American Revolution. The U.S. had already unilaterally declared hostilities over the previous April. Brown had already received orders from London in June to cease and desist.

Following that treaty, Dragging Canoe turned to the Spanish (who still claimed all the territory south of the Cumberland and were now working against the Americans) for support, trading primarily through Pensacola and Mobile. Dragging Canoe also maintained relations with the British governor at Detroit, Alexander McKee, through regular diplomatic missions there under his brothers Little Owl and The Badger (Ukuna).

With the end of the Revolutionary War, new settlers began flooding into the Overmountain settlements. The reaction from the Cherokee was predictable, only it did not come from the towns on the lower Little Tennessee. Instead, warriors from the Middle Towns east of the mountains on the upper Little Tennessee began retaliation against the settlements on the west side, targeting the newer ones on the Pigeon and French Broad rivers. In late 1783, Major Peter Fine raised a small militia and crossed the mountains to the east side and burned down the town of Cowee.

=== Treaties with the Chickasaw and Muscogee ===
The Chickasaw signed the Treaty of French Lick with the new United States of America on November 6, 1783, and never again took up arms against it. The Lower Cherokee were also present at the conference and apparently made some sort of agreement to cease their attacks on the Cumberland, for after this Americans settlements in the area began to grow again.

Also in November 1783, the pro-American camp of the Lower Muscogee nation signed the Treaty of Augusta with Georgia, ceding their claims to territory in northern Georgia known as the Oconee Country, after the tribe who lived there. This enraged McGillivray, who wanted to keep fighting; he burned the houses of the leaders responsible and sent warriors to raid Georgia settlements.

== Post-Revolution: New directions (1783–1788) ==
=== Spanish alliance ===
The Spanish now held East Florida and West Florida in addition to Louisiana, Tejas, Nuevo Mexico, and Nueva California. Partly to hold the Americans at bay and partly to regain lost parts of La Florida, they armed and supplied the Southern Indians both to curry favor and to encourage them to turn their weapons on the frontier settlements. Largely through the efforts of Alex McGillivray, the Spanish signed the Treaty of Pensacola for alliance and commerce with the Upper Muscogee and the Lower Cherokee on May 30, 1784. On June 22, 1784, the Treaty of Mobile was signed with the Choctaw and the Alabama. The Chickasaw, also at this conference, refused to sign because of their treaty with the Americans. With the signing of these two treaties, McDonald and Ross relocated to Turkeytown to consolidate their efforts and business with those of Campbell closer to their Spanish suppliers and to the British trading house of Panton, Leslie & Company in Pensacola.

Sponsored by the Spanish, Running Water Town hosted a grand council of western nations and tribes in the summer of 1785 to formulate a strategy for resisting encroachment by settlers from the new United States. Besides the Chickamauga Cherokee, the Upper Muscogee and the Choctaw attended from the South, while representatives from the Shawnee, Lenape, Mingo, Miami, Illinois, Wyandot, Ottawa, Mohawk, Kickapoo, Kaskaskia, Odawa, Potawatomi, Ojibwe, Wabash Confederacy, and the Iroquois League, came from the North. The same parties met again under sponsorship of the British at Detroit in the fall of 1785. The parties at these two councils agreed among themselves and with their sponsors to deal with the Americans as a unit. This laid the groundwork for the confederacy formally established the next year.

=== Overmountain region ===
With these assurances of support, the Cherokee of the Lower Towns renewed raiding the Overmountain settlements that summer. These remained only sporadic until the fall, when an incident between one of the settlers, James Hubbard, and a noted Cherokee leader in the Overhill Towns, Noonday, brought the younger Overhill warriors into the fight and incited them all to more violence. This could be considered the start of a Southwest Indian War, fought by the Cherokee and later the Muscogee too.

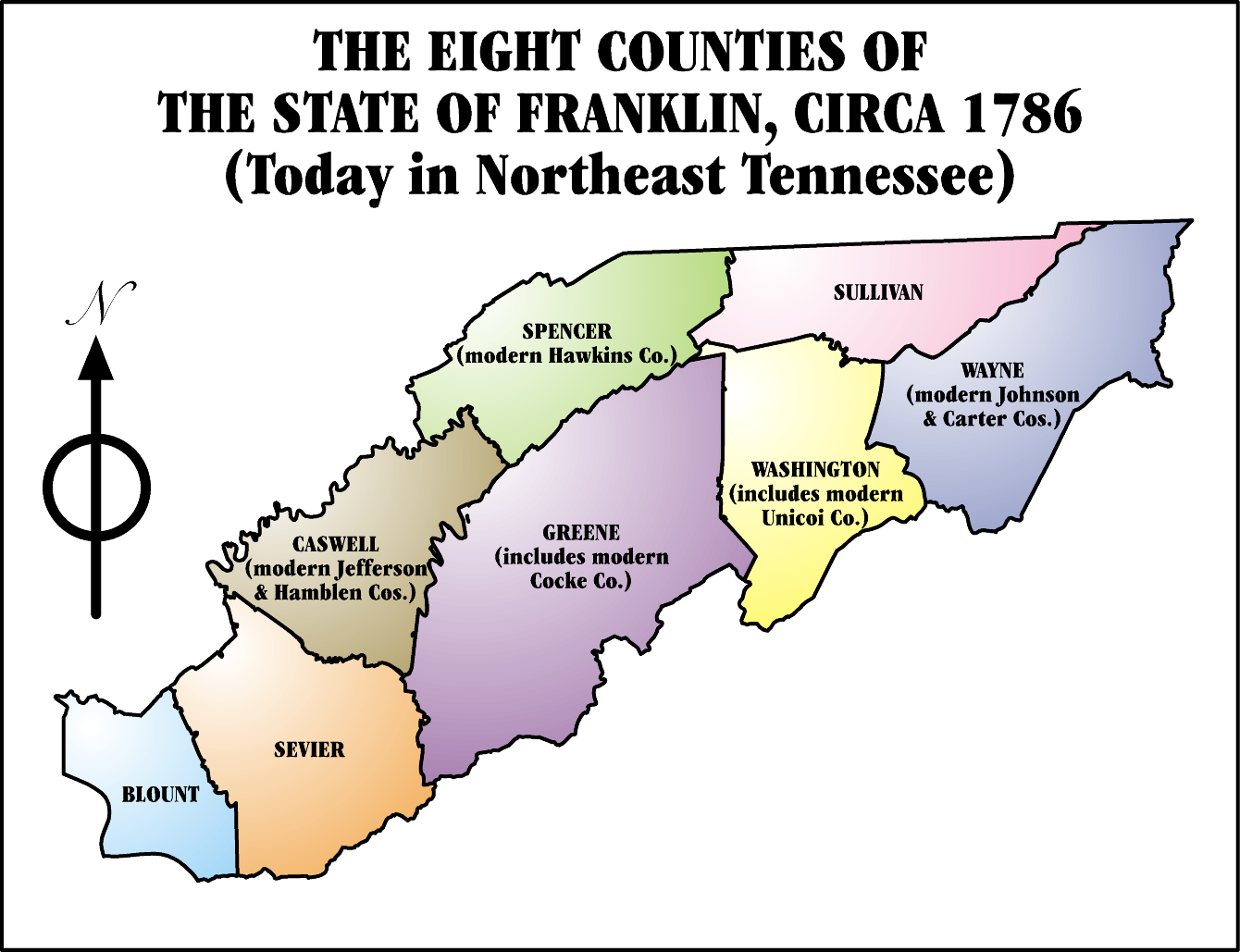
State of Franklin

In May 1785, the settlements of Upper East Tennessee, then comprising four counties of western North Carolina, petitioned the Congress of the Confederation to be recognized as the "State of Franklin". Even though their petition failed to receive the two-thirds votes necessary to qualify, they proceeded to organize what amounted to a secessionist government, holding their first "state" assembly in December 1785. One of their chief motives was to retain the foothold they had recently gained in the Cumberland Basin. The Cumberland settlements were included in the government, but being separated by a wide stretch of hostile Cherokee territory, they were essentially autonomous.

One of the first acts of the new State of Franklin was to negotiate with the Overhill Towns the Treaty of Dumplin Creek, signed on June 10, 1785, which ceded the "territory south of the French Broad and Holston Rivers and west of the Big Pigeon River and east of the ridge dividing Little River from the Tennessee River" to the State of Franklin.

The Cherokee in the Overhill, Hill, and Valley Towns signed the Treaty of Hopewell with the United States government on November 28, 1785, under duress, the frontier colonials by this time having spread further along the Holston and onto the French Broad. Several leaders from the Lower Cherokee signed, including two from Chickamauga Town (which had been rebuilt) and one from Stecoyee.

=== Oconee War ===
In spring 1785, McGillivray had convened a council of war at the dominant Upper Muscogee town of Tuckabatchee about recent incursions of Georgian settlers into the Oconee territory. The council, attended by most of the nations and tribes of the soon-to-be Western Confederacy, decided to go on the warpath against the trespassers, starting with the recent settlements along the Oconee River. McGillivray had already secured support from the Spanish in New Orleans. This began the Oconee War, which lasted from May 1785 until September 1794.

Georgia officials signed a new treaty with a few compliant Lower Muscogee micos (headmen) in which the latter ceded the land between the Altamaha and St. Mary's Rivers, and from the head of the latter to the Oconee River. They called this wide stretch of land the Tallassee Country, after the tribe which lived there.

=== Houston County, Georgia ===
After the Hopewell Treaty, the legislature of the State of Georgia, which claimed all of what became Mississippi Territory created Houston County, to take in the Great Bend of the Tennessee River. The project was a joint venture between Georgia and the State of Franklin. To stake their claim, Valentine Sevier and 90 men went south to what is now South Pittsburg, Tennessee, and built a stockaded settlement and blockhouse in early December 1785.

The chosen location lay midway between Nickajack and Long Island towns of the Chickamauga-Lower Cherokee. By mid-January 1786, the pioneers tired of the constant life-or-death fighting and ended the project. The Houston County project collapsed, leaving the name open for the current Houston County, Georgia, established in 1821.

In order to prevent a re-occurrence, the Cherokee established the town of Crowmocker on Battle Creek near the site of the Civil War-era Fort McCook.

=== Spanish conspiracy ===
Coat of arms of the House of Bourbon in Spain

Starting in 1786, the leaders of the State of Franklin and the Cumberland District began secret negotiations with Esteban Rodríguez Miró, governor of Spanish Louisiana, to deliver their regions to the jurisdiction of the Spanish Empire. Those involved included James Robertson, Daniel Smith, and Anthony Bledsoe of the Cumberland District; John Sevier and Joseph Martin of the State of Franklin; James White, recently appointed American Superintendent for Southern Indian Affairs; and James Wilkinson, governor of Kentucky.

Map of the US territories that would have been ceded to New Spain as a result of the Spanish conspiracy.

The irony lay in the fact that the Spaniards backed the Cherokee and Muscogee harassing their territories. Miró's negotiations with Wilkinson, initiated by the latter, to bring Kentucky into Spanish control also were separate but simultaneous. The conspiracy went as far as the Franklin and Cumberland officials promising to take the oath of loyalty to Spain and renounce allegiance to any other nation. Robertson even successfully petitioned the North Carolina assembly to create the "Mero Judicial District" for the three Cumberland counties (Davidson, Sumner, Tennessee). There was a convention held in the failing State of Franklin on the question, and those present voted in its favor.

A large part of their motivation, besides the desire to secede from North Carolina, was the hope that this course of action would bring relief from Indian attacks. The series of negotiations involved Alex McGillivray, with Robertson and Bledsoe writing him of the Miro District's peaceful intentions toward the Muscogee and simultaneously sending White as emissary to Gardoqui to convey news of their overture.

=== Cherokee war of 1786 ===
Conflict erupted largely because of dissatisfaction over the Treaty of Hopewell, the flames of which were fanned by Dragging Canoe. In the east, it primarily involved warriors from the Overhill and Valley Towns against Franklin, while the Lower Towns to the west primarily raided the Cumberland. In large part elated by their crushing defeat of the attempted Houston County, Cherokee warriors from the Lower Towns raided the Franklin settlements in small parties throughout the spring of 1786. First attacking a homestead on Beaver Creek near the newly established White's Fort (at the modern Knoxville, Tennessee) on July 20, they dispersed into small parties raiding the upper Holston and other parts of Franklin. Throughout the summer of 1786, Dragging Canoe and his warriors along with a large contingent of Muscogee raided the Cumberland region, with several parties raiding well into Kentucky.

After the rise of the "local" Cherokee, Sevier responded with a force under joint command of Alexander Outlaw and William Cocke, which drove off the raiders from the Holston before marching for Coyatee near the mouth of the Little Tennessee. Once there, they burned the crops and the town's council house. Meanwhile, Sevier led another expedition across the mountains to attack the Valley Towns on the headwaters of the Hiwassee. The result was the Treaty of Coyatee on August 3, 1786, in which the State of Franklin forced Corntassel, Hanging Maw, Watts, and the other Overhill leaders to cede the remaining land between the boundary set by the Dumplin Treaty and the Little Tennessee River to the State of Franklin.

=== Formation of the Western Confederacy ===
In addition to the small bands still operating with the Shawnee, Wyandot-Mingo, and Lenape in the Northwest, a large contingent of Cherokee led by The Glass (Tagwadihi) attended and took an active role in a grand council of western tribes (Six Nations Iroquois, Wyandot, Lenape, Shawnee, Odawa, Ojibwe, Potawotami, Twigtis, Wabash Confederacy, and, of course, the Cherokee themselves) lasting November 28 – December 18, 1786, in the Wyandot town of Upper Sandusky just south of the British capital of Detroit. British agents attended, and zealous warriors brought recently acquired scalps.

This meeting, initiated by Joseph Brant, the Mohawk leader who was head chief of the Iroquois Six Nations and like Dragging Canoe fought on the side of the British during the American Revolution, led to the formation of the Western Confederacy to resist American incursions into the Old Northwest. Dragging Canoe and his Cherokee were full members of the Confederacy. The purpose of the Confederacy was to coordinate attacks and defense in the Northwest Indian War of 1785–1795. According to John Norton, Brant's adopted son, it was here in the north that The Glass formed a friendship with his adopted father that lasted well into the 19th century. The passage of the Northwest Ordinance by the Congress of the Confederation in 1787, establishing the Northwest Territory and essentially giving away the land upon which they lived, only exacerbated the resentment of the tribes in the region.

=== Trouble with Franklin and Kentucky ===
In early 1787, encroachments by American settlers became so great that the Overhill Towns held a council on whether to completely abandon their homes on the Little Tennessee for more removed locations to the west. They elected to stay, but the crisis provoked another rise in the small-scale raiding which never really ceased completely. The situation of the Overhill Cherokee was so bad that refugees appeared in Muscogee towns, and the Chickasaw threatened to break the treaty of 1783 and go on the warpath if something were not done to alleviate the situation.

Though they provided auxiliary support against Franklin, the Cherokee of the Lower Towns, playing their role as members of the confederacy, had made Kentucky the target of most of their efforts. A sally from the Kentucky militia led by John Logan mistakenly attacked a hunting party from the Overhill Towns and killed several of its members. In their non-apology to Chota, the Kentuckians warned the Overhill Towns to control Dragging Canoe's warriors or there would be widespread indiscriminate revenge.

=== Coldwater Indian war (1785–1787) ===
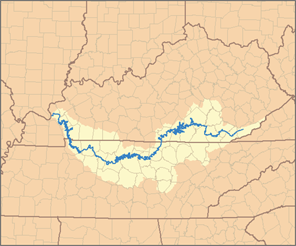
Cumberland River watershed

Around 1785, Cherokee and Muscogee warriors began to gather in Coldwater town, who then attacked the American settlements along the Cumberland and its environs. The fighting contingent eventually numbered approximately 9 Frenchmen, 35 Cherokee, and 10 Muscogee. Because the townsite was well-hidden and its presence unannounced, James Robertson, commander of the militia in the Cumberland's Davidson and Sumner Counties, at first accused the Lower Cherokee of the new offensives. In 1787, he marched his men to their borders in a show of force, but without an actual attack, then sent an offer of peace to Running Water. In answer, Dragging Canoe sent a delegation of leaders led by Little Owl to Nashville under a flag of truce to explain that his Cherokee were not the responsible parties. Meanwhile, the attacks continued.

At the time of the conference in Nashville, two Chickasaw out hunting game along the Tennessee in the vicinity of Muscle Shoals chanced upon Coldwater Town, where they were warmly received and spent the night. Upon returning home to Chickasaw Bluffs, now Memphis, Tennessee, they informed their head man, Piomingo, of their discovery. Piomingo then sent runners to Nashville. Just after these runners had arrived in Nashville, a war party attacked one of its outlying settlements, killing Robertson's brother Mark. In response, Robertson raised a group of 150 volunteers and proceeded south by a circuitous land route, guided by two Chickasaw. Somehow catching the town off guard despite the fact they knew Robertson's force was approaching, they chased its defenders to the river, killing about half of them and wounding many of the rest. They then gathered all the trade goods in the town to be shipped to Nashville by boat, burned the town, and departed. After the wars, Coldwater Town became the site of Colbert's Ferry, owned by Chickasaw leader George Colbert, the crossing place of the Natchez Trace over the Tennessee River.

== Post-Revolution: Peak of Cherokee influence (1788–1792) ==
=== Cherokee-Franklin war (1788–1789) ===
The conflict between the Cherokee and the Americans in the State of Franklin erupted into its bloodiest and most widespread since 1776, beginning in late spring and lasting well into the beginning of the following year. One important feature of this conflict was the introduction of large numbers of Muscogee warriors fighting in Cherokee war parties, which continued until the end of the Cherokee wars.

==== Isolated massacres ====
In May 1788, a party of Cherokee from Chilhowee came to the house of John Kirk's family on Little River, while he and his oldest son, John Jr., were out. When Kirk and John Jr. returned, they found the other eleven members of their family dead and scalped. This was the beginning of a Cherokee campaign of raids across the region, to which the frontiers people responded by retreating inside forts and stations.

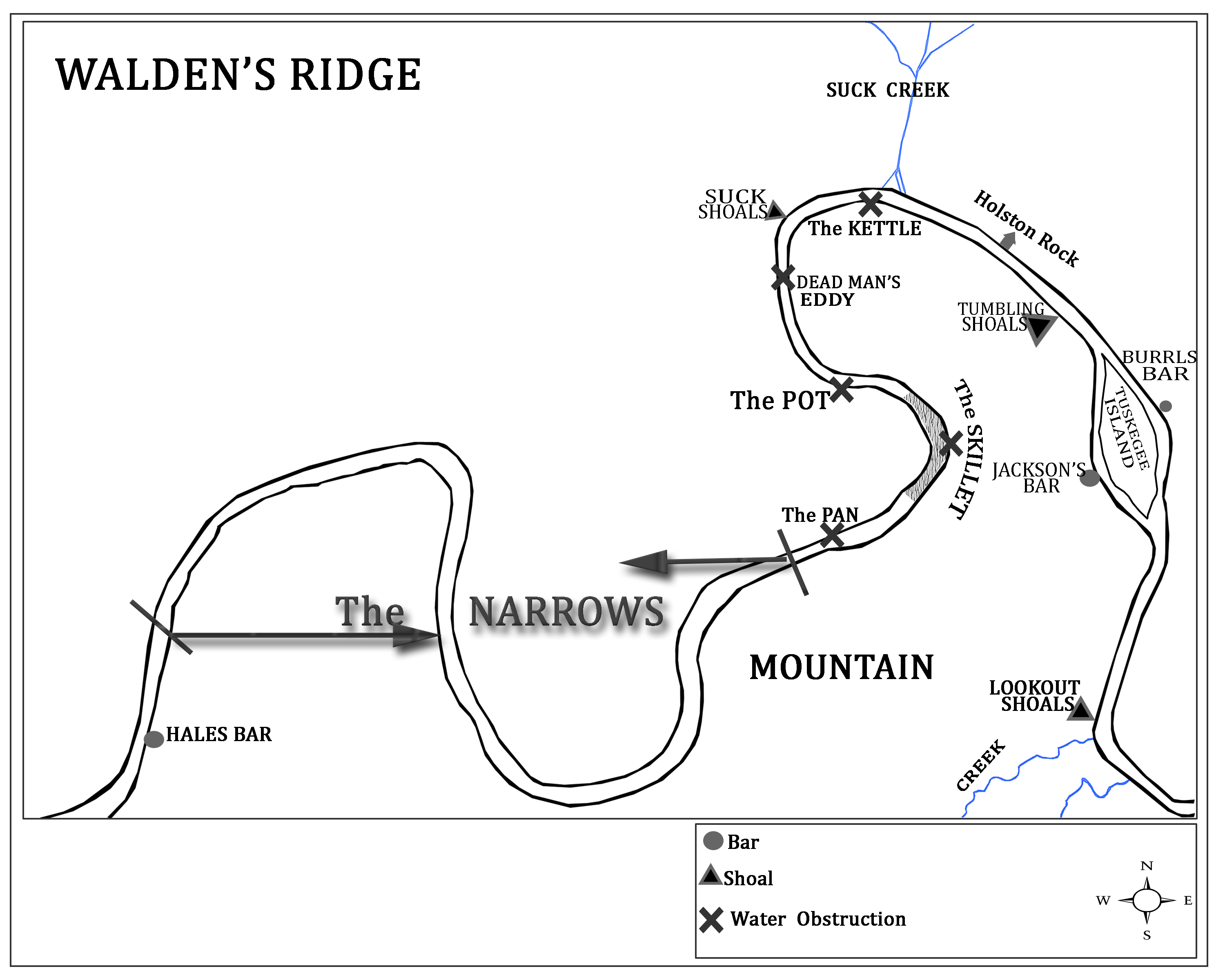
The various hazards of the Tennessee River Gorge, also known as Cash Canyon or The Suck

In May 1788, James Brown of North Carolina departed Long-Island-on-the-Holston by boat, destined for the Cumberland to settle there. When they passed by Williams Island in Chattanooga, Bloody Fellow stopped them, looked around the boat, then let them proceed, meanwhile sending messengers ahead to Running Water.

Upon the family's arrival at Nickajack, a party of 40 under mixed-blood John Vann boarded the boat and killed Col. Brown, his two older sons on the boat, and five other young men traveling with the family. Mrs. Brown, the two younger sons, and three daughters were taken prisoner and distributed to different families. When he learned of the massacre the following day, The Breath, Nickajack's headman, was angered. He later adopted into his own family the Browns' son Joseph as a son. Mrs. Brown and one of her daughters were given to the Muscogee and ended up in the personal household of Alex McGillivray.

==== Franklinite invasion of the Overhill Towns ====
In June 1788, John Sevier, no longer governor of the State of Franklin, raised 100 volunteers and set out for the Overhill Towns. After a brief stop at the Little Tennessee, the group went to Great Hiwassee and burned it to the ground. Then they returned to the Little Tennessee and burned down Tallasee.

Returning to Chota, Sevier sent a detachment led by James Hubbard to Chilhowee to punish those responsible for the Kirk massacre. Hubbard's force included John Kirk Jr. Hubbard brought along Corntassel and Hanging Maw from Chota. At Chilhowee, Hubbard raised a flag of truce and took Corntassel and Hanging Maw to the house of Abraham, still headman of the town. He was there with his son, also bringing along Long Fellow and Fool Warrior. Hubbard posted guards at the door and windows of the cabin, and gave John Kirk Jr. a tomahawk to get his revenge.

The murder of the pacifist Overhill chiefs under a flag of truce angered the entire Cherokee nation. Men who had been reluctant to participate took to the warpath. The increase in hostility lasted for several months. Doublehead, Corntassel's brother, was particularly incensed. Not only did the Cherokee from the Overhill Towns join those from the Lower Towns on the warpath, so too did a large number of Muscogee warriors.

Highlighting the seriousness of the matter, Dragging Canoe came to address the general council of the Nation, meeting at Ustanali on the Coosawattee River (one of the former Lower Towns on the Keowee River relocated to the vicinity of Calhoun, Georgia) to which the seat of the council had been moved. The council elected Little Turkey as First Beloved Man to succeed the murdered chief. The election was contested by Hanging Maw of Coyatee; he had been elected chief headman of the traditional Overhill Towns on the Little Tennessee. Both men had been among those who originally followed Dragging Canoe into the southwest.

==== Siege of Houston's Station ====
In August 1788, the commander of the garrison at Houston's Station (near the present Maryville, Tennessee) received word that a Cherokee force of nearly 500 was planning to attack his position. He therefore sent a large reconnaissance patrol to the Overhill Towns.

Stopping in the town of Citico on the south side of the Little Tennessee, which they found deserted, the patrol scattered throughout the town's orchard and began gathering fruit. Six of them died in the first fusillade, another ten while attempting to escape across the river.

With the loss of those men, the garrison at Houston's Station was seriously beleaguered. Only the arrival of a relief force under John Sevier saved the fort from being overrun and its inhabitants slaughtered. With the garrison joining his force, Sevier marched to the Little Tennessee and burned Chilhowee.

==== Attempted invasion of the Lower Towns ====
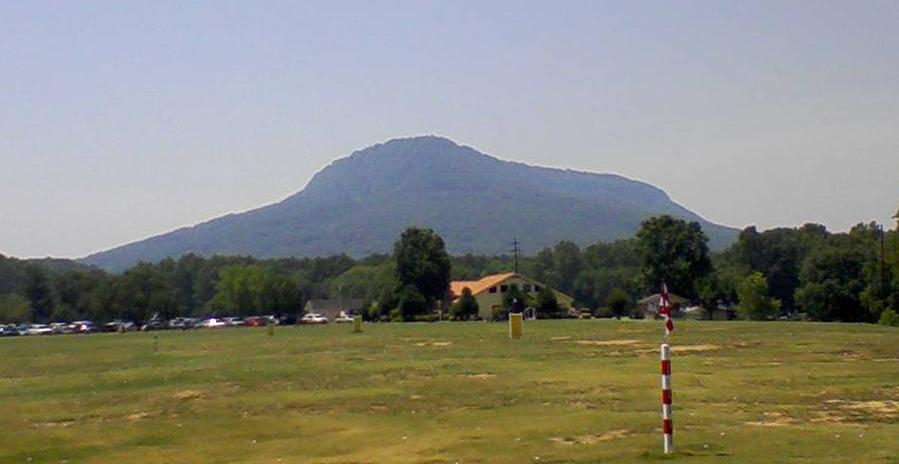
Lookout Mountain from Moccasin Bend

Later in August, Joseph Martin (who was married to Betsy, daughter of Nancy Ward, and living at Chota), with 500 men, marched to the Chickamauga area, intending to penetrate the edge of the Cumberland Mountains to get to the Five Lower Towns. He sent a detachment to secure the pass over the foot of Lookout Mountain, which was ambushed and routed by a large party of Dragging Canoe's warriors, with the Cherokee in hot pursuit. One of the participants later referred to the spot as "the place where we made the Virginians turn their backs". According to one of the participants on the other side, Dragging Canoe, John Watts, Bloody Fellow, Kitegisky, The Glass, Little Owl, and Dick Justice were all present at the encounter.

Dragging Canoe raised an army of 3,000 Cherokee warriors, which he split into more flexible war bands of hundreds of warriors each. One band was headed by John Watts, with Bloody Fellow, Kitegisky, and The Glass. It included a young warrior named Pathkiller, who later became known as The Ridge.

==== Battles of Gillespie's Station and others ====
In October 1788, Watts' band advanced across country toward White's Fort. Along the way, they attacked Gillespie's Station on the Holston River after capturing settlers who had left the enclosure to work in the fields, storming the stockade when the defender's ammunition ran out, killing the men and some of the women and taking 28 women and children prisoner. They then proceeded to attack White's Fort and Houston's Station, only to be beaten back. Afterward, the war band wintered at an encampment on the Flint River in present-day Unicoi County, Tennessee as a base of operations.

An attack by another large party against Sherrill's Station on Nolichucky River was driven off by a force commanded by Sevier. In response to the Cherokee incursions, the settlers increased their retaliatory attacks. Troops under Sevier invaded the Middle and Valley Towns in North Carolina.

Bob Benge, with a group of Cherokee warriors, evacuated the general population from Ustalli, on the Hiwassee; they left a rearguard to ensure their escape. After firing the town, Sevier and his group pursued the fleeing inhabitants, and were ambushed at the mouth of the Valley River by Benge's party.

The U.S. soldiers went to the village of Coota-cloo-hee and burned down its cornfields, but they were chased off by 400 warriors led by Watts (Young Tassel). Watts' army trailed Sevier's all the way from Coota-cloo-hee back to the Franklin settlements, attacking at random. Consequently, the Overhill Cherokee and refugees from the Lower and Valley towns virtually abandoned the settlements on the Little Tennessee and dispersed south and west. Chota was the only Overhill town left with many inhabitants.

=== Council at Coweta ===
On March 2, 1789, the Lower Muscogee chief town of Coweta hosted a council between their division of the Muscogee Confederacy and the Cherokee. As town headman, John Galphin, half-blood son of former Indian Commissioner for the United States George Galphin, presided. Dragging Canoe and Hanging Maw led the Cherokee delegation. The representative of the two nations present agreed they trusted neither the Americans nor the Spanish and drafted a letter to the government of Great Britain, pledging their loyalty in return for the king's direct assistance. They promised that if this happened, then the Mohawk, the Choctaw, and the Chickasaw would come over. Nothing ever came of the petition.

=== Prisoner exchange ===
John Watts' band on Flint Creek fell upon serious misfortune in January 1789. They were surrounded by a force under John Sevier that was equipped with grasshopper cannons. The gunfire from the Cherokee was so intense, however, that Sevier abandoned his heavy weapons and ordered a cavalry charge that led to savage hand-to-hand fighting. Watt's band lost nearly 150 warriors.

Word of their defeat did not reach Running Water until April, when it arrived with an offer from Sevier for an exchange of prisoners which specifically mentioned the surviving members of the Brown family, including Joseph, who had been adopted first by Kitegisky and later by The Breath. Among those captured at Flint Creek were Bloody Fellow and Little Turkey's daughter.

Joseph and his sister Polly were brought immediately to Running Water, but when runners were sent to Crow Town to retrieve Jane, their youngest sister, her owner refused to surrender her. Bob Benge, present in Running Water at the time, mounted his horse and hefted his famous axe, saying, "I will bring the girl, or the owner's head". The next morning he returned with Jane. The three were handed over to Sevier at Coosawattee on April 20. McGillivray delivered Mrs. Brown and Elizabeth to her son William during a trip to Rock Landing, Georgia, in November. George, the other surviving son from the trip, remained with the Muscogee until 1798.

=== Non-treaty of Swannanoa ===
The next month, on May 25, 1789, the Cherokee were supposed to sign a peace treaty with the United States at the War Ford on the French Broad River, near Swannanoa, North Carolina. The Americans chose the location because it was scene of a major Cherokee defeat in 1776. The Cherokee leaders never showed, but when the Americans under Andrew Pickens ran across Cherokee on their way to Rock Landing on the Oconee River to meet with the Muscogee, they were assured hostilities were over.

=== Doublehead's war ===
The opposite end of Muscle Shoals from Coldwater Town was occupied in 1790 by a roughly 40-strong warrior party under Doublehead. He had gained permission to establish his town at the head of the Shoals, which was in Chickasaw territory, because the local headman, George Colbert, the mixed-blood leader who later owned Colbert's Ferry at the foot of Muscle Shoals, was his son-in-law.

Like the former Coldwater Town, Doublehead's Town was diverse, with Cherokee, Muscogee, Shawnee, and a few Chickasaw. It quickly grew beyond the initial 40 warriors, who carried out many small raids against settlers on the Cumberland and into Kentucky. During one foray in June 1792, his warriors ambushed a canoe carrying the three sons of Valentine Sevier (brother of John) and three others on a scouting expedition searching for his party. They killed the three Seviers and another man; two escaped.

Doublehead conducted his operations largely independently of the Lower Cherokee, though he did take part in large operations with them on occasion, such as the invasion of the Cumberland in 1792 and that of the Holston in 1793.

=== Treaty of New York (1790) ===
Dragging Canoe's long-time ally among the Muscogee, Alex McGillivray, led a delegation of twenty-seven leaders north, where they signed the Treaty of New York in August 1790 with the United States government on behalf of the "Upper, Middle, and Lower Creek and Seminole composing the Creek nation of Indians". In it, McGillivray, who was made an America brigadier general, ceded in the name of the Confederacy the Oconee Country. In return the federal government upheld Muscogee rights to all of the Tallassee Country.

Although intended to end the Oconee War, it angered the American settlers expelled from the Tallassee Country and Muscogee who wanted to keep the Oconee Country, so the war continued. The treaty also marked the beginning of the decline of McGillivray's influence in the Muscogee Confederacy and the rise of that of William Augustus Bowles, a bitter rival dating back to the Spanish campaign against Pensacola. By mid-1791, Bowles wielded enough influence to send large war parties raiding the Cumberland once again despite the treaty.

=== Muscle Shoals settlement ===
In January 1791, a group of land speculators named the Tennessee Company from the Southwest Territory, led by James Hubbard and Peter Bryant, attempted to gain control of the Muscle Shoals and its vicinity by building a settlement and fort at the head of the Shoals. They did so against an executive order of President Washington forbidding it, as relayed to them by the governor of the Southwest Territory, William Blount. The Glass came down from Running Water with 60 warriors and descended upon the defenders, captained by Valentine Sevier, brother of John. The Glass told them to leave immediately or be killed, then burned their blockhouse as they departed.

=== Bob Benge's war ===
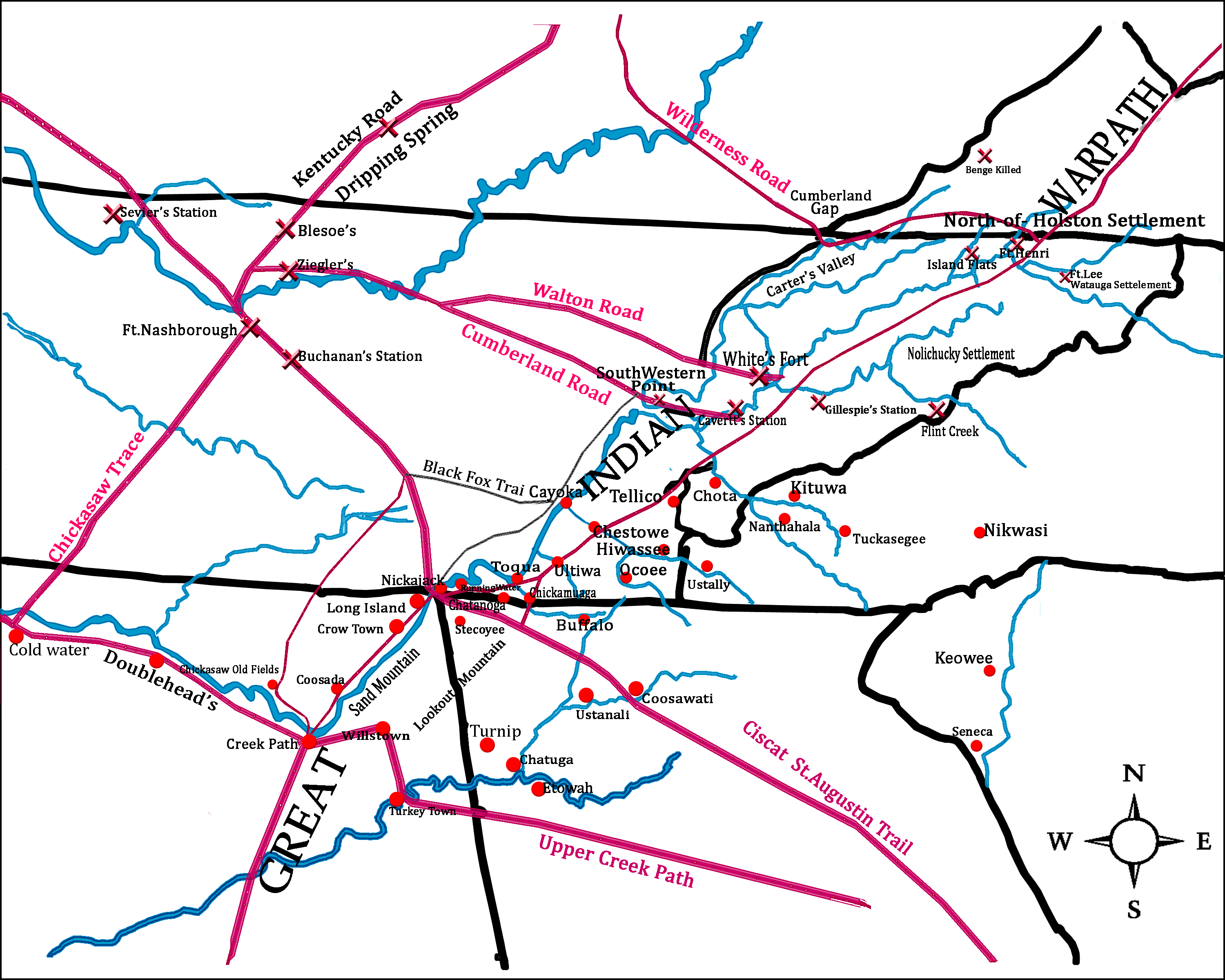
The primary areas of operations during the Chickamauga Wars

Starting in 1791, Benge and his brother The Tail, based at Willstown, began leading attacks against settlers in East Tennessee, Southwest Virginia, and Kentucky, often in conjunction with Doublehead and his warriors from Coldwater. Eventually, he became one of the most feared warriors on the frontier.

=== Treaty of Holston (1791) ===
The Treaty of Holston, signed in July 1791, required the Upper Towns to cede more land in return for continued peace because the U.S. government proved unable to stop or roll back illegal settlements. As it appeared to guarantee Cherokee sovereignty, the chiefs of the Upper Cherokee believed they had the same status as states. Several representatives of the Lower Cherokee participated in the negotiations and signed the treaty, including John Watts, Doublehead, Bloody Fellow, Black Fox (Dragging Canoe's nephew), The Badger (his brother), and Rising Fawn.

=== Battle of the Wabash ===
Later in the summer, a small delegation of Cherokee under Dragging Canoe's brother Little Owl traveled north to meet with the Indian leaders of the Western Confederacy, chief among them Blue Jacket of the Shawnee, Little Turtle of the Miami, and Buckongahelas of the Lenape. While they were there, word arrived that Arthur St. Clair, Governor of the Northwest Territory, was planning an invasion against the allied tribes in the north. Little Owl immediately sent word south to Running Water.

Dragging Canoe quickly sent a 30-strong war party north under his brother The Badger, where, along with the warriors of Little Owl and Turtle-at-Home they participated in the decisive encounter in November 1791 known as the Battle of the Wabash, the worst defeat ever inflicted by Native Americans upon the American military, the American military body count of which far surpassed that at the more famous Battle of the Little Bighorn in 1876.

After the battle, Little Owl, The Badger, and Turtle-at-Home returned south with most of the warriors who had accompanied the first two. The warriors who had come north years earlier remained in the Ohio region, but the returning warriors brought back a party of 30 Shawnee under the leadership of one known as Shawnee Warrior that frequently operated alongside warriors under Little Owl.

=== Death of Dragging Canoe ===
Inspired by news of the northern victory, Dragging Canoe embarked on a mission to unite the native people of his area as had Little Turtle and Blue Jacket by visiting the other major tribes in the region. His embassies to the Lower Muscogee and the Choctaw were successful, but the Chickasaw living to the west refused his overtures. Upon his return, which coincided with that of The Glass and Dick Justice, and of Turtle-at-Home, a huge all-night celebration was held at Stecoyee at which the Eagle Dance was performed in his honor.

By the morning of March 1, 1792, Dragging Canoe was dead, as a result of exhaustion from dancing all night, or possibly a heart attack. A procession of honor carried his body to Running Water, where he was buried. He was even memorialized at the general council of the Nation held in Ustanali on June 28, 1792, by his nephew Black Fox:

The Dragging Canoe has left this world. He was a man of consequence in his country. He was friend to both his own and the white people. His brother [Little Owl] is still in place, and I mention it now publicly that I intend presenting him with his deceased brother's medal; for he promises fair to possess sentiments similar to those of his brother, both with regard to the red and the white. It is mentioned here publicly that both red and white may know it, and pay attention to him.

The minutes of the council list Little Turkey as "Great Beloved Man of the whole Nation", Hanging Maw as "Beloved Man of the Northern Division" (Overhill Towns), and The Badger as "Beloved Man of the Southern Division" (Upper Towns in North Georgia).

Such was the respect for him as a leader and patriot of his people that Governor Blount, leader of his greatest enemies, remarked upon hearing of his death that, "Dragging Canoe stood second to none in the Nation".

== Post-Revolution: the Watts years (1792–1795) ==
At his own previous request, Dragging Canoe was succeeded as leader of the Lower Cherokee by John Watts, although The Bowl succeeded him as headman of Running Water. Bloody Fellow and Doublehead continued Dragging Canoe's policy of Indian unity, including an agreement with McGillivray of the Upper Muscogee to build joint blockhouses from which warriors of both tribes could operate at the confluence of the Tennessee and Clinch Rivers, at Running Water and at Muscle Shoals.

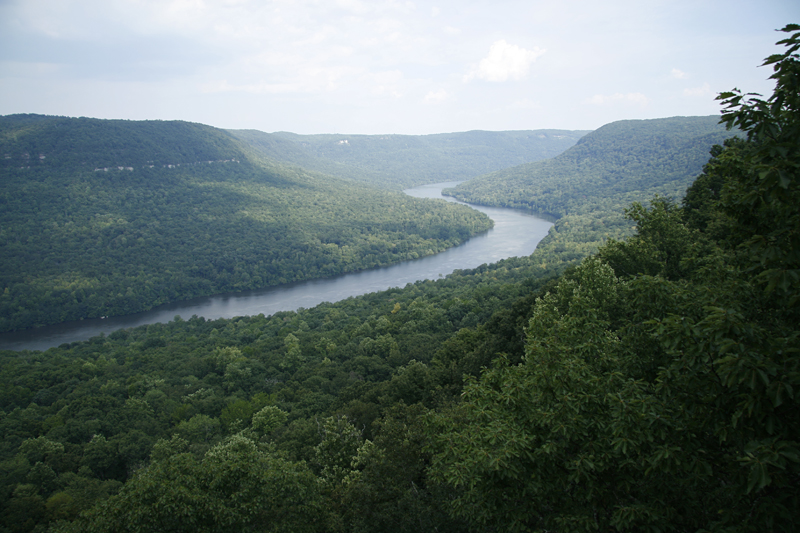
Tennessee River Gorge from Snooper's Rock

Watts, Tahlonteeskee, and 'Young Dragging Canoe' (whose actual name was Tsula, or "Red Fox") traveled to Pensacola in May at the invitation of Arturo O'Neill de Tyrone, Spanish governor of West Florida. They took with them letters of introduction from John McDonald. Once there, they forged a treaty with O'Neill for arms and supplies. Upon returning north, Watts moved his base of operations to Willstown.

Meanwhile, John McDonald, now British Indian Affairs Superintendent, moved to Turkeytown with his assistant Daniel Ross and their families. Some of the older chiefs, such as The Glass of Running Water, The Breath of Nickajack, and Dick Justice of Stecoyee, abstained from active warfare but did nothing to stop the warriors in their towns from taking part in raids and campaigns.

The Trans-Appalachian communities formerly of North Carolina became the Southwest Territory of the United States in 1790. For administrative purposes, the territorial government grouped the counties in the Overmountain region together as the Washington District, while those in the Cumberland region became the Mero District, already the name for its judicial district since 1788.

Cherokee and Muscogee warriors and their Shawnee guests began raiding both districts of the Southwest Territory. In April 1792, a Cherokee-Shawnee war party led by Bob Benge and Shawnee Warrior invaded the Holston region and began raids all over the vicinity. In the summer of 1792, a war party from Running Water led by Little Owl and the Shawnee Warrior joined them in their raids. On June 26, the same day that Dragging Canoe was being memorialized at the national council in Ustanali, the combined group of Cherokee, Shawnee, and a few Muscogee destroyed Ziegler's Station in Sumner County. This action led the Governor James Robertson of the Mero District to call up a battalion of troops to spread throughout the region as guards.

=== Invasion of the Mero District ===
On September 7 or 8, 1792, a council of Cherokee meeting at Running Water formally declared war against the United States. Watts orchestrated a large campaign intending to attack the Washington District with a large combined army in four bands of 200 each. When the warriors were mustering at Stecoyee, however, he learned that their planned attack was expected and decided to aim for the Mero District instead. The army Watts led into the Cumberland region was nearly 1,000 strong, including a contingent of cavalry.

From their launch point, Tahlonteeskee (Doublehead's brother) and The Tail (Bob Benge's brother) led a party to ambush the Kentucky Road. Doublehead led another to the Cumberland Road. Middle Striker led his party to do the same on the Walton Road. Watts led the main force, made up of 280 Cherokee, Shawnee, and Muscogee warriors plus cavalry, intending to go against the fort at Nashville. He sent out George Fields and John Walker, as scouts ahead of the army, and they killed the two scouts sent out by James Robertson from Nashville.

Near their target on the evening of September 30, Watts's combined force came upon a small fort known as Buchanan's Station, commanded by John Buchanan. Talotiskee, leader of the Muscogee, wanted to attack it immediately, while Watts argued in favor of saving it for the return south. After much bickering, Watts gave in around midnight. The assault proved to be a disaster for Watts. Watts was gravely wounded, and as many as 30 of his warriors were killed, including Talotiskee and some of Watts' best leaders; Shawnee Warrior, Kitegisky, and Dragging Canoe's brother Little Owl were among those who died in the encounter.

Doublehead's group of 60 ambushed a party of 6 and took one scalp then headed toward Nashville. On their way, they were attacked by a militia force and lost 13 men. Tahlonteeskee's party, meanwhile, stayed out into early October, attacking Black's Station on Crooked Creek, killing three, wounding more, and capturing several horses. Middle Striker's party ambushed a large armed force coming to the Mero District down the Walton Road in November and routed it completely without losing a single man.

In revenge for the deaths at Buchanan's Station, Benge, Doublehead, and his brother Pumpkin Boy led a party of 60 into southwestern Kentucky in early 1793 during which their warriors, in an act initiated by Doublehead, cooked and ate the enemies they had just killed. Afterward, Doublehead's party returned south and held scalp dances at Stecoyee, Turnip Town, and Willstown, since warriors from those towns had also participated in the raid in addition to his and Benge's groups.

=== Spring and summer campaigns, 1793 ===
A party of Muscogee under a mixed-race warrior named Lesley began attacking isolated farmsteads. Lesley's party continued harassment of the Holston settlements until the summer of 1794. Lesley's group was not the only Muscogee party, nor were the Muscogee alone. Warriors from the Upper Towns and some from the Overhill and Valley Towns, also raided the eastern districts in the spring and summer of 1793.

In the Mero District, besides scalping raids, two parties attacked Bledsoe's Station and Greenfield Station in April 1793. Another party attacked Hays' Station in June. In August, the Coushatta from Coosada raided the country around Clarksville, Tennessee, attacking the homestead of the Baker family, killing all but two who escaped and one taken prisoner who was later ransomed at Coosada Town.

=== Peace overtures ===
After the visit of the Shawnee, Watts sent envoys to Knoxville, then the capital of the Southwest Territory, to meet with Governor William Blount to discuss terms for peace. The party that was sent from the Lower Towns that May included Bob McLemore, Tahlonteeskee, Captain Charley of Running Water, and Doublehead, among several others. They met at Henry's Station on February 4, 1793, and Blount invited the Lower Cherokee to send a delegation to the Philadelphia to meet with President Washington.

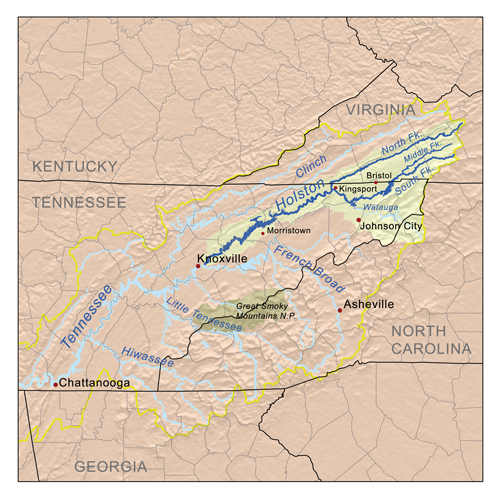
Upper East Tennessee

The meeting in Philadelphia was scheduled for June 1793. On the way, the diplomatic party from the Lower Towns stopped in Coyatee because Hanging Maw and other chiefs from the Upper Towns were going also. A large party of Lower Cherokee had been raiding the Upper East, killed two men, and stole twenty horses. On their way out, they passed through Coyatee, to which the pursuit party tracked them.

The militia violated their orders not to cross the Little Tennessee, then the border between the Cherokee nation and the Southwest Territory, firing indiscriminately. In the ensuing chaos, 11 leading men were killed, including Captain Charley, and several wounded, including Hanging Maw, his wife and daughter, Doublehead, and Tahlonteeskee; one of the white delegates was among the dead. The Cherokee, including Watts' hostile warriors, agreed to await the outcome of the subsequent trial. The trial proved to be a farce, in large part because John Beard, the man responsible, was a close friend of John Sevier.

=== Invasion of the Eastern Districts ===
Watts responded to Beard's acquittal by invading the Holston area with one of the largest Indian forces ever seen in the region, over 1,000 Cherokee and Muscogee, plus a few Shawnee, intending to attack Knoxville. The plan was to have four bodies of troops march toward Knoxville separately, converging at a rendezvous point along the way.

In August, Watts attacked Henry's Station with a force of 200 but fell back after sustaining overwhelming gunfire coming from the fort. The four columns converged a month later near the present Loudon, Tennessee, and proceeded toward their target. On the way, the Cherokee leaders were discussing among themselves whether to kill all the inhabitants of Knoxville, or just the men, James Vann advocating the latter while Doublehead argued for the former.

Further on the way, they encountered a small settlement called Cavett's Station on September 25, 1793. After they had surrounded the place, Benge negotiated with the inhabitants, agreeing that if they surrendered, their lives would be spared. However, after the settlers had walked out, Doublehead's group and his Muscogee allies attacked and began killing them, over the pleas of Benge and the others. Vann managed to grab one small boy and pull him onto his saddle, only to have Doublehead smash the boy's skull with an axe. Watts intervened in time to save another young boy, handing him to Vann, who put the boy behind him on his horse and later handed him over to three of the Muscogee for safe-keeping; one of the Muscogee chiefs killed the boy and scalped him a few days later.

Because of this incident, Vann called Doublehead "Babykiller" (deliberately parodying the honorable title "Mankiller") for the remainder of his life; and it also began a lengthy feud which defined the politics of the early 19th century Cherokee Nation and only ended in 1807 with Doublehead's death at Vann's orders. By this time, tensions among the Cherokee broke out into such vehement arguments that the force broke up, with the main group retiring south.

=== Battle of Hightower ===
Sevier countered the invasion with an invasion and occupation of Ustanali, which had been deserted; there was no fighting there other than an indecisive skirmish with a Cherokee-Muscogee scouting party. He and his men then followed the Cherokee-Muscogee force south to the town of Etowah (near the site of present-day Cartersville, Georgia across the Etowah River from the Etowah Indian Mounds), leading to the "Battle of Hightower" on October 17, 1793. His force defeated their opponents soundly, then went on to destroy several Cherokee villages to the west before retiring to the Southwest Territory. The battle was the last pitched battle of the wars between the Cherokee and the American frontier people.

=== Spring and summer 1794 ===
Between January and September 1794, there were more than forty raids by war parties of both Cherokee and Muscogee on the Mero District. On the part of the Cherokee, these were mostly carried out by Doublehead. These raids precipitated the Nickajack Expedition in September which ended the Cherokee–American wars once and for all.

Meanwhile, Bob Benge attacked Washington District and Southwest Virginia, losing his life in the latter on April 6, 1794. The militia sent his red-haired scalp to Governor Henry Lee III. Benge was not alone in raiding the Eastern Districts. Fifty horses were stolen in the region that same month. Twenty-five warriors attacked the Town Creek blockhouse. An entire family save one was massacred south of the French Broad. There were many other attacks.

Frustrated with the governor's call for restraint, John Beard, leader of the chase group that attacked the diplomatic party, organized a party of 150 men in the Washington District and attacked the Hiwasee Towns, burning two, including Great Hiwassee, and killing several Cherokee. Against orders, George Doherty of the Hamilton District militia mustered his men and attacked Great Tellico, burning it to the ground, then crossed the mountains into the Valley Towns, in which they burned at least two towns and several acres of crops.

On June 9, 1794, a party of Cherokee under Whitemankiller (George Fields) overtook a river party under William Scott at Muscle Shoals. They killed its white passengers, looted the goods, and took the African-American slaves as captives.

On June 26, 1794, the federal government and the Cherokee signed the Treaty of Philadelphia, which essentially reaffirmed the land cessions of the 1785 Treaty of Hopwell and the 1791 Treaty of Holston. Both the Doublehead and Bloody Fellow signed it.

=== End of Lesley's war party ===
In July 1794, Hanging Maw sent his men along with the volunteers from the Holston settlements to pursue Lesley's Muscogee war party, killing two and handing over a third to the whites for trial and execution on August 4. Two days later, a small war party of Muscogee crossed the Tennessee River at Chestua Creek in modern Bradley County. Hanging Maw called up his warriors, 50 of whom joined with federal troops in pursuit, while the rest guarded Coyatee. They caught up with the party they were pursuing on August 12 near Craig's Station and defeated them. Different Muscogee war parties, however, escaped their pursuers and attacked the Holston frontier for the rest of the month.

=== Nickajack Expedition and peace treaty ===
Desiring to end the wars once and for all, Robertson sent a detachment of U.S. regular troops, Mero District militia, and Kentucky volunteers to the Five Lower Towns under U.S. Army Major James Ore. Guided by knowledgeable locals, including former captive Joseph Brown, Ore's army traveled down the Cisca and St. Augustine Trail toward the Five Lower Towns.

On September 13, the army attacked Nickajack, killing many of the inhabitants, including its chief. After torching the houses, the soldiers went upriver and burned Running Water. Joseph Brown fought alongside the soldiers but tried to spare women and children. The Cherokee casualties were relatively light, as the majority of the population of both towns were in Willstown attending a major stickball game.

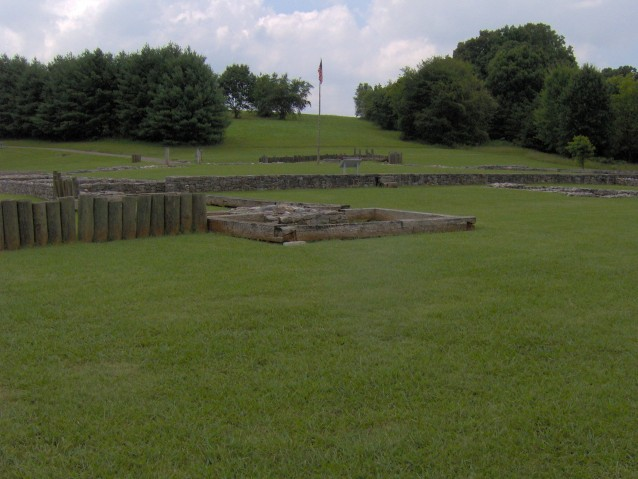
The Tellico Blockhouse site, with posts and stone fill showing the original layout

Watts finally decided to call for peace: he was discouraged by the destruction of the two towns, the death of Bob Benge in April, and the recent defeat of the Western Confederacy by General "Mad Anthony" Wayne's army at the Battle of Fallen Timbers. More than 100 Cherokee had fought there. The loss of support from the Spanish, who had their own problems against France in the War of the First Coalition, convinced Watts to end the fighting.

On November 7, 1794, he made the Treaty of Tellico Blockhouse, which was notable for not requiring any further cession of land other than requiring the Lower Cherokee to recognize the cessions of the Holston Treaty. This led to a period of relative peace into the 19th century.

The Muscogee kept on fighting after the destruction of Nickajack and Running Water and the following peace between the Lower Cherokee and the United States. In October 1794, they attacked Bledsoe's Station again. In November, they attacked Sevier's Station and killed fourteen of the inhabitants, Valentine Sevier being one of the few survivors.

In December 1794, a force of Cherokee warriors from the Upper Towns stopped a Muscogee campaign against the frontier settlements of the state of Georgia and warned them to cease attacking the Southwest Territory's Eastern Districts as well. In early January 1795, however, the Chickasaw, who had sent warriors to take part in the Army of the Northwest, began killing Muscogee warriors found in Middle Tennessee as allies of the United States and taking their scalps, so in March, the Muscogee began to turn their attentions away from the Cumberland to the Chickasaw, over the entreaties of the Cherokee and the Choctaw.

== Aftermath ==
Following the peace treaty, leaders from the Lower Cherokee were dominant in national affairs. When the national government of all the Cherokee was organized, the first three persons to hold the office of Principal Chief of the Cherokee Nation – Little Turkey (1788–1801), Black Fox (1801–1811), and Pathkiller (1811–1827) – had previously served as warriors under Dragging Canoe, as had the first two Speakers of the Cherokee National Council, established in 1794, Doublehead and Turtle-at-Home.

The domination of the Cherokee Nation by the former warriors from the Lower Towns continued well into the 19th century. Even after the revolt of the young chiefs of the Upper Towns, the Lower Towns were a major voice, and the "young chiefs" of the Upper Towns who dominated that region had themselves previously been warriors with Dragging Canoe and Watts.

Because of the continuing hostilities that followed the Revolution, the United States placed one of the two permanent garrisons of the new country at Fort Southwest Point at the confluence of the Tennessee and Clinch Rivers; the other was at Fort Pitt in Pennsylvania.

== See also ==
- Cherokee Nation of Oklahoma
- Eastern Band of Cherokee Indians
- Historic treaties of the Cherokee
- Timeline of Cherokee removal
- Principal Chiefs of the Cherokee
- Salisbury District Brigade under Brigadier General Rutherford, engagements and timeline
- United Keetoowah Band of Cherokee Indians
