= John Watts (Cherokee chief) =

Cherokee chief

John Watts or Kunokeski (1750–1808), also known as Young Tassel, was one of the leaders of the Chickamauga Cherokee (or "Lower Cherokee") during the Cherokee–American wars. Watts became particularly active in the fighting after frontiersmen murdered his uncle, Old Tassel (1708–1788).

== Family life ==
John Watts was the son of a sister of the Cherokee chief known as Corn Tassel or Old Tassel. He was likely born around 1746 or 1750 in the Cherokee Nation. His father is believed to have been the John Watts, a white trader who served Captain Demere as an interpreter during the construction of Fort Loudoun, and whose wife was the sister of the chiefs Old Tassel, Doublehead, and Pumpkin Boy. His wife or wives are unknown, but according to researcher Don Martini he was the brother of Unacata (Whitemankiller) and a Cherokee killed at Boyd's Creek and was the father of John Watts, Big Rattlinggourd, and perhaps Hard Mush (Gatunuali) "

== Separation from the Overhill Towns ==
Although Watts withdrew from the Overhill Towns along with Dragging Canoe's band, at first he was minimally involved in the raiding they made against American settlers during and after the Revolutionary War. Watts moved with the band downriver to Running Water Town, still in Tennessee but further from the frontier. Later they moved to Willstown, in what is now Alabama.

== Warrior ==
Watts led his first major action of the Cherokee-American wars in 1786 against the forces of the State of Franklin over their incursions into the territory of the Overhill Cherokee. Warriors from the Valley Towns in North Carolina also joined in the attacks.

In October 1788, following the murder of his uncle Old Tassel by frontiersmen, Watts led a large war party into North Carolina's Washington District (now Tennessee). The band included the young man The Ridge (known as Nunnehidihi, or Ganundalegi) going into his first battle. They captured and burned Gillespie's Station, killing its defenders and taking several prisoners. The Cherokee warriors proceeded against White's Fort (modern day Knoxville, Tennessee), where they were repulsed. Afterward, the group made a semi-permanent camp along Flint Creek (in the area of the future Unicoi County, Tennessee), harassing, raiding, and attacking white settlers in the surrounding countryside. Watts was one of the leaders of the Indian confederacy that failed in their 1792 attack of Buchanan's Station, though he was badly wounded and barely survived.

Watts signed the 1791 Treaty of Holston, along with fellow war leaders: Doublehead, Bloody Fellow, Black Fox (a future chief of the Cherokee Nation), The Badger (Dragging Canoe's brother), and Rising Fawn.

== War chief of the Lower Cherokee ==
In 1792, Dragging Canoe died suddenly on March 1, 1792, but he had earlier said he wanted Watts to succeed him. Watts, was then living again in the Overhill area. He became war council head, or "skiagusta," of the Lower Cherokee.

=== First actions ===
Watts, along with Bloody Fellow, Doublehead, and "Young Dragging Canoe" (Tsula), continued to encourage Indian unity in resistance to European-American settlers. He honored the agreement with McGillivray, of the Upper Muscogee, to build blockhouses (from which warriors of both tribes could operate) at Running Water, Tennessee, Muscle Shoals in Alabama and at the junction of the Tennessee and Clinch rivers near Kingston, Tennessee.

Watts also traveled to Pensacola to conclude a treaty with the Spanish governor of West Florida, Arturo O'Neill. Under that treaty, the Spanish would provide arms and supplies to the Native Americans to carry on their war against the U.S. At about this time, Watts moved his base of operations to Willstown (Cherokee town), in what is now Alabama. This put the Cherokee closer to their Muscogee allies while shielding them from the westward expansion of the new United States.

In September 1792, Watts assembled a large gathering of Cherokee and Muscogee warriors (which included some cavalry). He planned to lead a campaign into the Cumberland region of Appalachia. It was to be a three-pronged attack: Tahlonteeskee (a.k.a. Ataluntiski) would lead a force to ambush the Kentucky road; Middle Striker would take the Walton road; and Watts would lead the main army of 280 Cherokee, Shawnee, and Muscogee warriors against Nashville (it was then the capital of the Miro District of the new Southwest Territory).

On the way to Nashville, the army encountered and attacked a settlement known as Buchanan's Station but suffered serious casualties. Watts was seriously wounded, and Siksika (known as "The Shawnee Warrior," and an older brother of Tecumseh)); Tahlonteeskee (also called Talotiskee of the Broken Arrow, a Muscogee warrior); Little Owl (a brother of Dragging Canoe); and Pumpkin Boy (a brother of Doublehead), all died in the encounter.

=== Last campaign ===
Later in 1793, Watts sent envoys to Knoxville, which was at the time the capital of the Southwest Territory, to meet with Governor Blount to discuss terms for a lasting peace. The peace party included Bob McLemore, Tahlonteeskee, Captain Charley of Running Water, and Doublehead, as well as the white delegates. Along the way, the group was attacked by a militant group of frontiersmen during a stop at the Overhill town of Coyatee. Hanging Maw was wounded, while his wife and daughter (along with several other Indians and one of the white delegates), were killed. The Cherokee people, along with Watts' Chickmauga warriors, agreed to await the outcome of the subsequent trial. In large part because the man responsible, COL. James Herrell Hubbert (who had lost his family in an Indian raid) was a close friend of John Sevier, the trial proved to be a farce.

Watts responded by leading an invasion of the Holston area with more than 1,000 Cherokee, Muscogee, and Shawnee warriors—one of the largest Native forces seen in the region. His target was Knoxville. Along the way, Cherokee leaders debated whether to kill all the settlers or only the men. Doublehead argued for killing everyone, while James Vann supported sparing the women and children.

On the way to Knoxville, the war party encountered the small settlement of Cavett's Station. After they had surrounded the place, Bob Benge negotiated with the inhabitants, agreeing that if they surrendered, their lives would be spared. However, after the settlers had walked out, Doublehead's group and his Muscogee allies attacked and killed them. Vann grabbed one small boy and pulled him onto his saddle, but Doublehead killed the boy with an axe. Watts intervened and saved another young boy, handing him to Vann, who put the boy behind him on his horse and later handed him over to three of the Muscogee for safe-keeping. One of the Muscogee killed and scalped the boy a few days later.

== Final peace ==
With the defeat of the Western Confederacy at the Battle of Fallen Timbers by the United States, and the destruction of Nickajack Town and Running Water Town in September 1794, the leaders of the Lower Cherokee became convinced that continuing the war was futile. The council signed the Treaty of Tellico Blockhouse in November, officially ending hostilities with the US.

Although the Cherokee established a "national" government in 1794—complete with a Principal Chief and National Council—it held little real power. Regional councils representing the major Cherokee geographic divisions continued to dominate decision-making within their respective areas. Watts rejected any national office and instead served as chief of the Lower Cherokee until his death in 1808. He was succeeded by Doublehead.

== Sources ==
- American State Papers, Indian Affairs, Vol. 1, 1789-1813, Congress of the United States, Washington, DC, 1831–1861.
- Brown, John P. Old Frontiers: The Story of the Cherokee Indians from Earliest Times to the Date of Their Removal to the West, 1838. (Kingsport: Southern Publishers, 1938).
- Evans, E. Raymond. "Notable Persons in Cherokee History: Bob Benge". Journal of Cherokee Studies, Vol. 1, No. 2, pp. 98–106. (Cherokee: Museum of the Cherokee Indian, 1976).
- Evans, E. Raymond. "Notable Persons in Cherokee History: Dragging Canoe". Journal of Cherokee Studies, Vol. 2, No. 2, pp. 176–189. (Cherokee: Museum of the Cherokee Indian, 1977).
- Haywood, W.H. The Civil and Political History of the State of Tennessee from its Earliest Settlement up to the Year 1796. (Nashville: Methodist Episcopal Publishing House, 1891).
- Klink, Karl, and James Talman, ed. The Journal of Major John Norton. (Toronto: Champlain Society, 1970).
- McLoughlin, William G. Cherokee Renascence in the New Republic. (Princeton: Princeton University Press, 1992).
- Mooney, James. Myths of the Cherokee and Sacred Formulas of the Cherokee. (Nashville: Charles and Randy Elder-Booksellers, 1982).
- Moore, John Trotwood and Austin P. Foster. Tennessee, The Volunteer State, 1769–1923, Vol. 1. (Chicago: S. J. Clarke Publishing Co., 1923).
- Ramsey, James Gettys McGregor. The Annals of Tennessee to the End of the Eighteenth Century. (Chattanooga: Judge David Campbell, 1926).
- Cruse Hardion, Freda. Birth of the Ozarks 1794-1839 Trail of Tears.

Preceded by Dragging Canoe	Leader of the Chickamauga/Lower Cherokee; 1792–1802	Succeeded by Doublehead
