= Tahlonteeskee =

Tahlonteeskee is the name of several Cherokee, and one Creek, Indians during the period of the Cherokee–American wars. The name, (rendered into Cherokee as Ata'lunti'ski), has been translated as "The Disturber" or "The Upsetter".

== People ==
- Tahlonteeskee (Cherokee chief) (also sometimes written as Talotisky), Principal Chief of the Cherokee Nation-West, 1817–1819
- Tahlonteeskee (Cherokee warrior) an elderly member of the Cherokee peace delegation to Philadelphia in 1791
- Tahlonteeskee (Creek chief) (or "Talotisky of the Broken Arrow") a Creek chieftain killed at the attack on Buchannan's Station, September 30, 1792

== Settlement ==
- Tahlonteeskee, Oklahoma, capital of the Cherokee Nation–West, near present-day Gore, Oklahoma
