= Tagwadihi =

Cherokee chief

Ta'gwadihi ("Catawba-killer"), also known as Thomas Glass or simply the Glass, at least in correspondence with American officials, was a leading chief of the Cherokee in the late 18th and early 19th centuries, eventually becoming the last principal chief of the Chickamauga (or Lower Cherokee).

== Early life ==
The Glass was the son of an adopted Wyandot. He first rose to prominence during the Cherokee–American wars, after having left the Overhill Towns along with Dragging Canoe's band in 1777.

== Leadership in war ==
Living at Nickajack Town (of the Five Lower Towns) after 1782, he remained one of the chief leaders of the Chickamauga throughout the Cherokee–American wars. The Glass led raids and war parties—often with Dick Justice of Lookout Mountain Town—at least as late as 1792.

In the journal of his travels in the South, particularly among the Chickamauga, John Norton reported several encounters with the Glass. Norton wrote that a few years after the Treaty of Paris in 1783, the old warrior traveled up to the North country among the Iroquois and became friends with Joseph Brant, the Mohawk, who was the head chief of the Six Nations and had the same year as the treaty initiated the formation of the Western Confederacy to resist American incursions into the Old Northwest. Norton was Brandt's adopted son. The resulting Northwest Indian War (1785-1795) included the great victory of the Western Confederacy at the Battle of the Wabash in 1791 and the American victory at the Battle of Fallen Timbers in 1795, which ended the distant war.

== After war prominence ==
After the Treaty of Tellico Blockhouse in 1794, the Glass remained prominent among the Lower Cherokee and in The Cherokee Nation as well, eventually becoming assistant principal chief to Black Fox. By the beginning of the 19th century, the Glass owned a ferry across Lookout Creek operating at the foot of Lookout Mountain, near present-day Chattanooga, Tennessee. He also partly owned (along with a fellow former war leader, Dick Justice) a nearby mill.

In the revolt of a group of the younger chiefs of the Upper Towns, in 1808, against the domination of national affairs by the older chiefs of the Lower Towns, both the Glass and Black Fox were deposed from their positions in the National Council. However, they were returned to their seats on the council two years later. Although Black Fox again became principal chief of the nation, the Glass did not return as his assistant. Following the assassination of Doublehead in 1809, the Glass succeeded him as head of the Lower Towns' council and was considered their principal chief. Because Black Fox was acknowledged to be the lawful principal chief of the Cherokee Nation, the local position, along with the Lower Towns' council, was disbanded the next year. This took place at the council in Willstown, in 1810, which abolished separate councils for each of the Cherokee divisions (Upper, Lower, Hill, and Valley Towns) as well as the practice of clan blood revenge.

== Sources ==
- Brown, John P. Old Frontiers: The Story of the Cherokee Indians from Earliest Times to the Date of Their Removal to the West, 1838. (Kingsport: Southern Publishers, 1938).
- Klink, Karl, and James Talman, ed. The Journal of Major John Norton. (Toronto: Champlain Society, 1970).
- Lowrie, Walter, and Matthew St. Clair Clarke, ed. American State Papers: Documents, Legislative and Executive, of the Congress of the United States, commencing March 3, 1789, and ending March 3, 1815. (Washington: Giles and Seaton, 1832).
- McLoughlin, William G. Cherokee Renascence in the New Republic. (Princeton: Princeton University Press, 1992).
- Moore, John Trotwood and Austin P. Foster. Tennessee, The Volunteer State, 1769-1923, Vol. 1. (Chicago: S. J. Clarke Publishing Co., 1923).
- Wilkins, Thurman. Cherokee Tragedy: The Ridge Family and the Decimation of a People. (New York: Macmillan Company, 1970).

Preceded by Doublehead	Leader of the Chickamauga/Lower Cherokee; 1807–1809	Succeeded by Position ceased to exist
