= Black Fox (Cherokee chief) =

Cherokee chief (c.1746–1811)

Black Fox (c. 1746-1811), also called Enola, was a Cherokee leader during the Cherokee–American wars. He was a signatory of the Holston Treaty, and later became a Principal Chief of the Cherokee Nation.

== Early leadership ==
Named at birth Enola (also rendered Inali or Enoli), Black Fox was born about 1746. He was a brother-in-law of Chickamauga Cherokee leader, Dragging Canoe, and accompanied him on his migrations south to the Lower Towns during the Cherokee–American wars. Black Fox was the "Beloved Man" (headman) of Ustanali, an important Native American settlement site which is located in what is today New Town in northwestern Georgia. As the fight with the frontier Americans drew to a close, he was one of the signers of the Treaty of Holston (July 2, 1791), an attempt at ending hostilities in the Holston River region.

== Principal chief ==
In 1801 Black Fox was named by the council of chiefs of the Lower and Upper Towns to succeed Little Turkey as Principal Chief of the original Cherokee Nation. The majority of Cherokee at that time lived in the Lower Towns. They were more isolated from European-American contact and tended to be more conservative, maintaining traditional practices and language.

During his term in office, Black Fox was the leading negotiator for the Cherokee people with the United States federal government. He is noted for relinquishing nearly 7,000 square miles (18,000 km^{2}) of land in what is today Tennessee and Alabama (under the treaty of January 7, 1806), for which he was given a lifetime annuity of $100. A controversial leader, Black Fox was deposed for a period, only to later be reinstated as Principal Chief in a compromise between two regional factions of Cherokees.

In 1807, Doublehead, who was then speaker of the National Council, signed a treaty without the authority of the council, ceding all Cherokee land west and north of the Tennessee River to the United States. This was land which for centuries had been used for foraging by the Cherokee. A separate arrangement reserved certain parcels of land for use by Doublehead and his relatives. Black Fox confirmed Doublehead's treaty, however, after Return J. Meigs, the United States Indian Agent, promised Black Fox he would receive $1,000 in cash and a regular annuity thereafter. Doublehead was killed shortly thereafter for what many Cherokee viewed as a traitorous act.

== Deposed ==
In 1808, Black Fox and The Glass (Tagwadihi), another leading chief in the Lower Towns, were deposed by the "young chiefs." These were men mostly from the Upper Towns, led by James Vann and Major Ridge. The driving force of this revolt was due largely to the peoples' resentment of the National Council's domination by older leaders of the Lower Towns, as well as disagreement over the many recent land cessions. Some of the leadership of the Upper Towns were multiracial in ancestry; in addition, their communities were more closely engaged by trade and other links with those of the American settlers, whose frontier had continuously encroached on Cherokee territory. The Upper Town chiefs acquiesced to these territorial changes and desired to work more closely with the Americans.

== Reinstated ==
Black Fox and The Glass were eventually reinstated in a compromise agreement between these two competing factions. This put an end to the councils of the Lower Towns meeting alternately in Willstown (near Fort Payne, Alabama) and Turkeytown (near present day Centre, Alabama), which were presided over by The Glass. Black Fox continued in the role of chief until the 1810 bureaucratic split with the "Old Settlers" then living in the west, remaining chief only of the people of the Cherokee Nation–East thereafter.

As the leading member of the National Council, and strongly influenced by the murder of Doublehead, Black Fox signed the law to end the Cherokee tradition of clan revenge in 1810. Upon his death the following year, he was succeeded by Principal Chief Pathkiller.

== Legacy ==
- Black Fox's early hunting camp was located on Lost Creek, in White County, Tennessee. The first European-American settlers in the middle district of Tennessee called one of the principal trails in the county "Black Fox Trail".
- They named a large group of springs at what is now Murfreesboro, Tennessee "Black Fox Springs".
- The community of Black Fox in modern Bradley County, Tennessee and its elementary school are named for him. Local historians say he had lived in the area but they are unsure of the dates.
- The historical Black Fox Crossing ford of the Clinch River between Claiborne and Grainger counties is now covered by the impounded waters of Norris Lake in Tennessee.
- The community of Inola, Oklahoma was named for him. The town was designated as the site of Black Fox Nuclear Power Plant, but community opposition forced the Public Service Company of Oklahoma to cancel its plans.

== Notes ==
- Brown, John P. "Eastern Cherokee chiefs", Chronicles of Oklahoma 16:1 (March 1938) 3-35 (retrieved August 18, 2006).
- McLoughlin, William G. Cherokee Renascence in the New Republic. [sic] (Princeton: Princeton University Press, 1992).

| Preceded by Little Turkey | Principal Chief of the original Cherokee Nation; 1801–1810 | Succeeded by Title ceased to exist |

| Preceded by Title did not exist | Principal Chief of the Cherokee Nation–East; 1810–1811 | Succeeded by Pathkiller |
