= Willstown (Cherokee town) =

Human settlement in Alabama, United States of America

Coordinates: 34°29′N 85°40′W

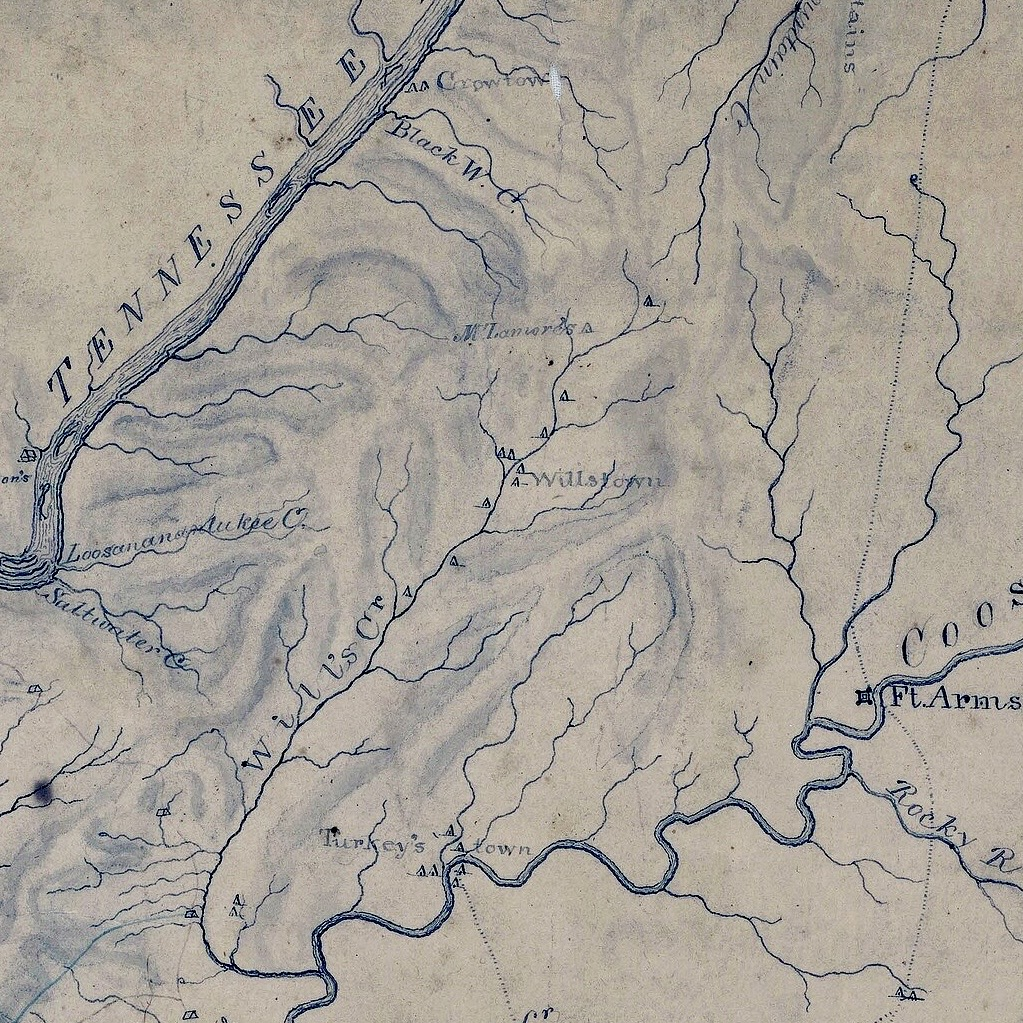
Will's Creek - Willtown - mapped 1810s

Willstown (sometimes Wattstown, or Titsohili, as it sounded in Cherokee) was an important Cherokee town of the late 18th and early 19th century, located in the southwesternmost part of the Cherokee Nation, in what is now DeKalb County, Alabama. It was near Lookout or Little Wills Creek. It was in Wills Valley, which also incorporated Big Wills Creek. This was within the territory of the Lower Creek, who had crossed into this area in an effort to avoid European-American encroachment.

Willstown was one of the trading centers along the Native American trading path in the region; it was also called the Creek Path. The town site overlapped the boundaries of present-day DeKalb and Etowah counties in Alabama.

Willstown was largely abandoned after most of the Cherokee were forcibly removed from the region by United States forces in the late 1830s. The city of Ft. Payne, Alabama developed nearby around the fort of the same name, built to intern the Cherokee before their removal.

== The town ==
Willstown was settled approx. 40–50 miles north of the southernmost perimeter of Lookout Mountain, near the banks of Lookout or Little Wills Creek. An historic marker, placed by the Daughters of the American Revolution (DAR) is placed near modern-day Sulphur Springs, Alabama, about 1.2 miles from the Georgia state line.

Willstown developed south of an ancient Indian trade path or trail. It was in the southwesternmost part of the original Cherokee Nation (in present-day DeKalb and Etowah counties of Alabama) prior to the Indian removal of 1836. Visible remnants of earthwork mounds remain at this site.

The settlement was commonly called "Willstown" after its headman, Will Weber (also known as "RedHead Chief Will"), who was known for his mane of thick red hair. He was Cherokee and European American in ancestry, and was raised as Cherokee.

The town had sometimes also been called Wattstown, because John Watts, a Cherokee leader of the group known as Chickamauga, had used it as his headquarters during the Cherokee–American wars.

Under pressure from European-American encroachment, Weber emigrated early from here, traveling with other Cherokee to the Arkansas country in 1796, and evading the 1830s removal. Watts died in 1802. Willstown served as the council seat of the Lower Cherokee well into the 19th century.

Willstown was one of the major Cherokee trade centers along the trade path. The trail ran through what is now Attalla, Alabama, and continued north along the edge of the mountains through what is now Reece City, Crudup, Keener, Collinsville, Killian, and Fort Payne into Valley Head and the old mining settlement of Battelle.

Three known Indian trading sites are located along the stretch between Attalla and Collinsville, as well as numerous burial sites, home sites, and remnants of farms. Since the 1920s, the current route of US Highway Eleven has largely followed that of the trading path. The right-of-way of the Great Southern Railroad was constructed along the lowlands by the creek and through the former town site of Willstown.

The present-day city of Ft. Payne, Alabama, developed south of Willstown and close to the Valley Head area. This city developed at the site of an Army fort of the same name. It was built about 1835 to intern Cherokee people who were rounded up in the region prior to their removal to Indian Territory. They called their forcible exile the Trail of Tears. Five forts were built in Alabama for the removal.

DeKalb County has installed historical markers at the former sites of the Willstown mission school and of the historic Fort Payne. It also is marking the route through the county, as far as Guntersville, Alabama, of an independent group led by chief John Benge (Cherokee) on the Trail of Tears. Other groups had guides appointed by the military. Benge departed with 1,103 Cherokee on October 3, 1838. According to county documentation, they traveled along the route of "what is now Alabama Highway 35 through Fort Payne, to the top of Sand Mountain and on to Rainsville. This path lead them along what is now Alabama Highway 75 to Albertville, then on to Highway 431 to Gunters Landing, now Guntersville."
