= Tahlonteeskee (Cherokee warrior) =

Cherokee warrior

Tahlonteeskee (Cherokee: ᏓᎶᎥᏗᏍᎩ, romanized: Dalonvdisgi) was a Cherokee warrior, and a brother or brother-in-law of Doublehead, a well known Chickamauga Cherokee warrior and follower of Dragging Canoe. Governor William Blount was told by John Watts that Tahlonteeskee was his uncle "of a kind," perhaps denoting a relationship by marriage.

== Cherokee–American Wars ==
There were several men that went by the name Tahlonteeskee at this time. This older man was a member of the Cherokee peace delegation to Philadelphia in 1791, accompanying Doublehead and Bloody Fellow. These diplomats met with President George Washington. Later, Tahlonteeskee joined his nephew, John Watts, and Young Dragging Canoe, in a secret trip to Pensacola, Florida, the purpose of which was to buy arms and supplies from a British agent. Governor Blount was informed of this trip by spy reports later printed in the "American State Papers."

== See also ==
- Tahlonteeskee (Cherokee chief) (also sometimes written as "Talotisky").
