= Timeline of Cherokee history =

This is a timeline of events in the history of the Cherokee Nation, from its earliest appearance in historical records to modern court cases in the United States. Some basic content about the removal of other southeastern tribes to lands west of the Mississippi River is included. In a series of treaties, these tribes ceded land to the United States.

== 1540–1775 ==
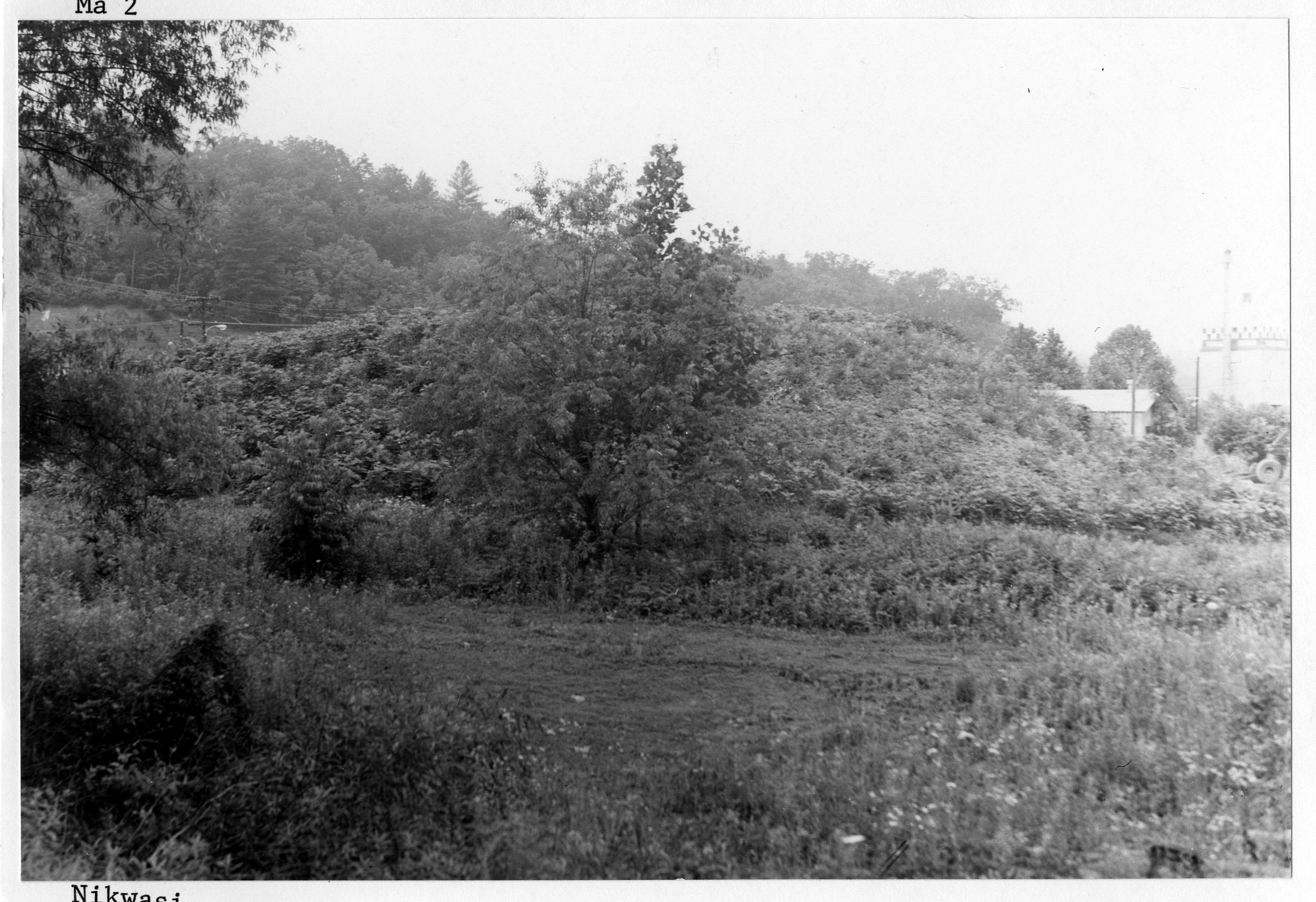
The Nikwasi Mound as photographed in June, 1963. The ascension ramp is at the left side of the photo.

| Year | Date | Event |
|---|---|---|
| c. 1540 | | Members of Hernando DeSoto’s expedition became the first recorded Europeans to encounter the Mississippian culture people, in the towns of Chalaque, Guaqili, Xuala (Joara), and Guasili. Joara was a regional chiefdom established around the year 1000 near the present day town of Morganton, North Carolina. These villages are believed to have been developed by Catawba ancestors (specifically the Cheraw). |
| c. 1567 | | On a lengthy journey into the interior from Santa Elena (present day South Carolina) to the planned capital of Spanish Florida, Juan Pardo established the Presidio of San Juan at Joara. In later journeys, Pardo encountered Native Americans in towns such as Nikwasi, Tocoa, and Kituwa. |
| c. 1654 | | English settlers from Jamestown, supported by a force of Pamunkey, attacked the "Rechahecrian" (possibly Cherokee) village of 600–700 warriors in the vicinity of present-day Richmond, and were soundly defeated. |
| c. 1670 | | German trader James Lederer travelled south from the James River in Virginia to Catawba territory near the newly established Province of Carolina, where he encountered the "Rickahockan," whom he placed on a map as being in the western mountains of present-day North Carolina. |
| c. 1708 | | The Lenape destroyed a Cherokee town in the upper Ohio River region and drove away its people. The Cherokee at Qually Boundary told anthropologist James Mooney these were the last Cherokee remaining in the north. |
| c. 1710–1715 | | The Cherokee and Chickasaw warred with the Shawnee of the Cumberland River basin in present-day Tennessee. |
| c. 1711–1715 | | The Cherokee joined other tribes and European militias in fighting against the Tuscarora, longtime enemies of the Cherokee. Their victory in the Tuscarora War forced the remaining Tuscarora to migrate north to New York, where they joined the Iroquois Confederacy as the Sixth Nation in 1722. |
| c. 1714 | | The Cherokee destroyed the Yuchi town of Chestowee on the Hiwassee River, in the brief Cherokee-Yuchi War. |
| c. 1715–1717 | | In the Yamasee War, the Cherokee initially joined other tribes, such as the Yamasee, Catawba, and Lower Muscogee), in attacking South Carolinian colonists. Along with the Catawba, the Cherokee switched sides during the course of the war, contributing to the defeat of their former allies. |
| c. 1721 | | The Cherokee signed the Treaty with the Province of South Carolina, ceding land between the Santee, Saluda, and Edisto Rivers. Subsequently, the first recorded band of Cherokee crossed the Mississippi River, supposedly led by a warrior named Dangerous Man (Yunwiusgaseti). Part of this band allegedly reached the Rocky Mountains and survived into the 19th century. In an attempt to reunite the Cherokee, Sequoyah left Indian territory for northern Mexico, where he disappeared. |
| c. 1730 | | Sir Alexander Cumming, who crowned Moytoy of Tellico as "Emperor of the Cherokee," took seven Cherokee leaders, including Attakullakulla, to London. They met with King George I and signed the Articles of Trade and Friendship between the Cherokee and the Kingdom of Great Britain. |
| c. 1753–1755 | | The Cherokee-Muscogee War was fought, culminating in the Battle of Taliwa. |
| c. 1754–1763 | | During the French and Indian War, the North American theater of the Seven Years' War, the Cherokee initially fought with British forces against those of the Kingdom of France, but British mistreatment of Cherokee forces led Moytoy to initiate the Anglo-Cherokee War, which the British won. At that war's conclusion, the Cherokee signed the Treaty of Long Island-on-the-Holston with the Colony of Virginia in 1761 and the Treaty of Charlestown with South Carolina in 1762. |
| c. 1755 | | The Cherokee signed the Treaty with South Carolina, ceding the land between the Wateree and Santee rivers. |
| c. 1758–1769 | | The Cherokee-Chickasaw War was fought, culminating in the Battle of Chickasaw Old Fields. |
| c. 1762 | May | Following his peace mission to the Overhill Towns, Lieutenant Henry Timberlake took three headmen—Ostenaco of Tomotley, Standing Turkey of Chota, and Wood Pigeon (Ata-wayi) of Keowee—to meet with George III in London to reaffirm the peace treaties signed at the end of the Anglo-Cherokee War. |
| 1763 | October 7 | King George III issued the Royal Proclamation of 1763, creating a boundary line along the crest of the Appalachian Mountains, beyond which colonists were forbidden to settle, in an effort to try to preserve Indian territory and reduce conflicts between colonists and Indians. |
| c. 1768 | | The Cherokee signed the Treaty of Hard Labour with the British Indian Superintendent, ceding land in southwest Virginia. |
| c. 1770 | | The Cherokee signed the Treaty of Lochaber with the British Indian Superintendent, ceding land in present-day Virginia, West Virginia, Tennessee, and Kentucky. |
| c. 1772 | | The Cherokee signed the Treaty with Virginia, ceding land in Virginia and eastern Kentucky. The Cherokee agreed to lease land to a group of colonists, creating the semi-autonomous Watauga Association. |
| c. 1773 | | The Cherokee signed the Treaty of Augusta, ceding over two million acres (8,000 km^{2}) to the colony of Georgia. |
| c. 1775 | | The Cherokee signed the Treaty of Sycamore Shoals, selling land to the Transylvania Company. A group of Cherokee defeated Spanish miners in the Mine La Motte area of Missouri. |

== 1775–1811 ==
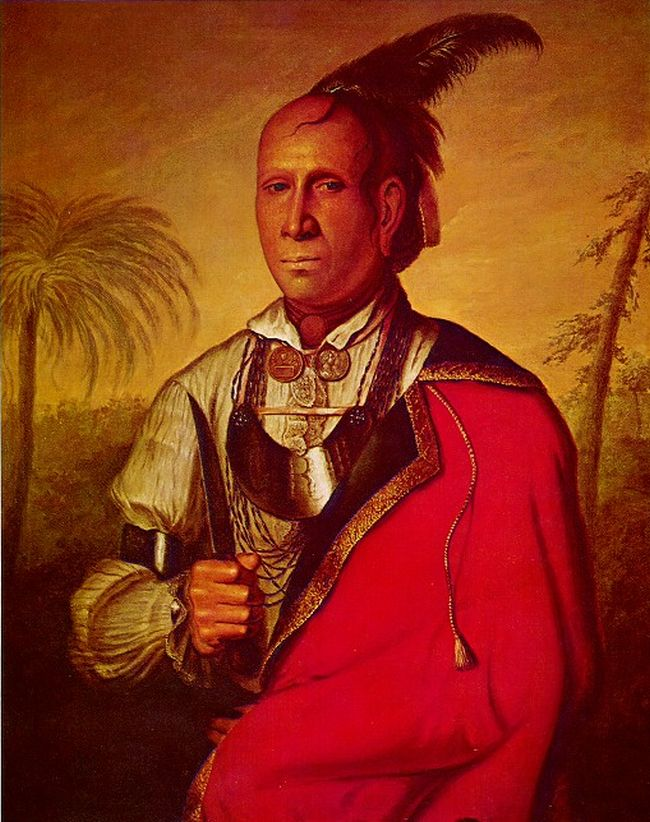
Cunne Shote, Cherokee Chief, by Francis Parsons (English), 1762, oil on canvas, Gilcrease Museum

| Year | Date | Event |
|---|---|---|
| c. 1775–1783 | | During the American Revolutionary War, the Cherokee supported British forces against rebelling American colonists. |
| c. 1777 | | The Cherokee signed the Treaty of DeWitts’ Corner with South Carolina and Georgia, and the Treaty of Fort Henry with Virginia and North Carolina, ceding lands in both cases. As a result, some Cherokee migrated westward into North Georgia; Dragging Canoe moved southwestward, leading a large group of like-minded Cherokee (known as the Chickamauga) to the present day Chattanooga area and began the Cherokee–American wars (1776–94). |
| c. 1782 | | A group of Cherokee under Standing Turkey received permission to emigrate west of the Mississippi from the governor of Spanish Louisiana, into present day Missouri. Dragging Canoe led his people further westward and southwestward, eventually penetrating present day Alabama as more Cherokee refugees migrated to the area. |
| c. 1783 | | The Cherokee signed the Treaty of Long Swamp Creek with the state of Georgia, ceding most of the land between the Savannah and Chattahoochee Rivers. |
| c. 1785 | November 28 | The Cherokee signed the Treaty of Hopewell with the United States, and the Treaty of Dumplin Creek and Treaty of Coyatee with the State of Franklin (part of present-day Tennessee). |
| c. 1788 | | The principal town of the Cherokee people was moved from Chota to Ustanali, near present-day Calhoun, Georgia, after a raid by settlers from East Tennessee resulted in the assassination of Old Tassel, the tribe's leading chief and several other leaders. Little Turkey, a former warrior, was elected headman, but Hanging Maw claimed the title by tradition. |
| 1791 | February 22 | The Cherokee signed the Treaty of Holston with the United States, establishing terms of relations between the tribe and the young nation. Among other provisions, the treaty made the United States responsible for managing foreign affairs for the Cherokee. |
| 1792 | March 1 | Dragging Canoe died near present-day Trenton, Georgia and was buried near present-day Whiteside, Tennessee. He was succeeded as leader of the Chickamauga Cherokee by John Watts. |
| 1793 | September 25 | On the way to attack White's Fort (present day Knoxville, Tennessee), a combined force of over 1000 Cherokee and Muscogee warriors under John Watts attacked a small fortified homestead called Cavett's Station. After Watts negotiated a surrender, another Cherokee chieftain, Doublehead, attacked and killed the homesteaders, despite the attempts of Watts and James Vann to stop him. The incident broke up the invasion force and began a bitter rivalry between Vann and Doublehead, which caused a rift in the Cherokee Nation lasting long past their deaths. |
| 1794 | June 26 | The Cherokee signed the Treaty of Philadelphia, selling land to the United States. |
| 1794 | November 7 | The Cherokee signed the Treaty of Tellico Blockhouse' with the United States, ending the Cherokee–American wars and establishing a Cherokee Nation. |
| c. 1794 | | Little Turkey was recognized by all Cherokee as Principal Chief of the Nation, and the Cherokee National Council was formally established as the nation's legislative body. |
| c. 1796 | | Mixed-blood, red haired chief Will Weber, whose town Titsohili later became known as Willstown in his honor, departed west over the Mississippi becoming one of the first of the "Old Settlers" in the Indian Territory. |
| 1798 | October 2 | The Cherokee signed the first Treaty of Tellico, affirming boundaries between the Cherokee Nation and the United States. |
| c. 1801 | | The Moravian Brethren established Spring Place Mission on land given to them by James Vann from his Diamond Hill plantation, the most important feature of which was a school. |
| c. 1802 | | The state of Georgia surrendered to the federal government its claims to its western lands; in exchange, President Thomas Jefferson nullifies the titles of the Muscogee and Cherokee to their lands within Georgia's borders. |
| c. 1803 | | With the death of Little Turkey, former warrior Black Fox was chosen to succeed him as principal chief. |
| 1804 | October 24 | The Cherokee signed another Treaty of Tellico, ceding land to the United States. |
| c. 1805 | | At the suggestion of Louisiana Territory Governor James Wilkinson, the Cherokee living in southeast Missouri on the Mississippi River moved to the Arkansas River, in what later became the Arkansaw Territory. |
| 1805 | October 25 | The Cherokee signed another Treaty of Tellico, ceding land to the United States, including for the Federal Road. |
| 1805 | October 27 | The Cherokee signed another Treaty of Tellico ceding land to the state of Tennessee state assembly to meet upon. |
| 1806 | January 7 | The Cherokee signed the Treaty of Washington, ceding land to the United States. |
| 1807 | August | Near present-day Calhoun, Tennessee, Major Ridge and Alexander Saunders assassinated Doublehead, Speaker of the Cherokee National Assembly, who engaged in secret land deals for personal profit. Doublehead's archrival James Vann was originally designated the main assassin, but was too inebriated at the time. |
| c. 1808 | | Because of their attempt to make a secret deal for their own profit with U.S. Commissioner Return J. Meigs, Black Fox and his assistant principal chief Tagwadihi were deposed from office at a council in Hiwassee Old Town. Black Fox was succeeded by Pathkiller, another former warrior. |
| 1808 | September 11 | The National Council, meeting at Broomtown, Alabama authorized the formation of the Cherokee Lighthorse Guard under Major Ridge. This patrol was charged with prevention squatting by Americans, robbery, horse theft, and cattle rustling. |
| c. 1809 | | A large group of Cherokee under Doublehead's brother Tahlonteeskee emigrated to lands in present day Arkansas, where Tahlonteeskee became the first principal chief of the Cherokee Nation West. Later that year, Meigs sent John Ross to these Cherokee as his deputy. The Cherokee National Committee was established to handle affairs of the nation between meetings of the National Council. |
| 1809 | February 19 | An unknown assassin killed James Vann. |
| c. 1810 | | A party under The Bowl and Tsulawi migrated west. Clans surrender the right to blood vengeance to the Cherokee Nation government. |

== 1811–1829 ==
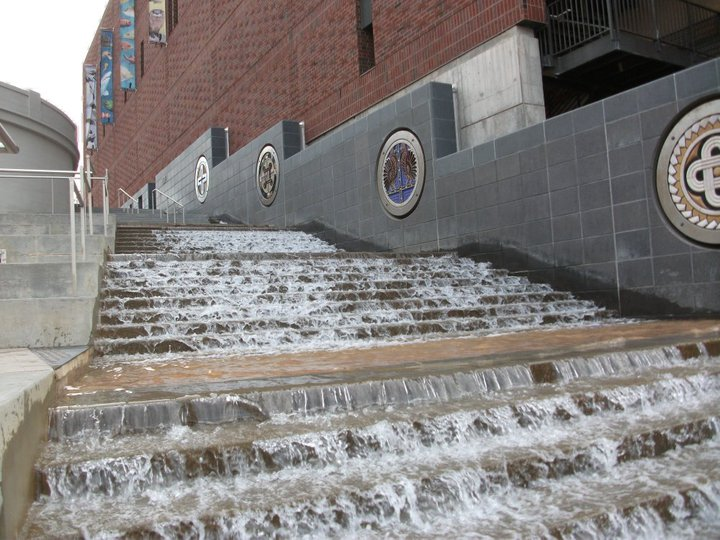
Water cascading down steps above Ross's Landing Riverfront Park

| Year | Date | Event |
|---|---|---|
| c. 1811 | | The "Cherokee Ghost Dance" movement, a somborie led by former warrior Tsali and influenced by Tecumseh and his brother Tenskwatawa, began. In Tecumseh's War, Shawnee leader Tecumseh led a confederacy of tribes in an unsuccessful war against American forces led by future president William Henry Harrison. Black Fox died, after having been restored as principal chief. He was again succeeded by Pathkiller, with Charles R. Hicks as assistant principal chief. |
| c. 1813–1814 | | The Cherokee joined the Creek War as part of Andrew Jackson's army at the request of the Lower Muscogee, who had been threatened by the Red Sticks. |
| c. 1815 | | John Ross opened a trading post on the Tennessee River that became known as Ross' Landing. Timothy Meigs, brother of US Indian agent Return J. Meigs, was his business partner. |
| 1816 | March 22 | The Cherokee signed another Treaty of Washington, ceding their remaining territory in South Carolina. |
| 1816 | September 14 | The Cherokee signed the Treaty of Chickasaw Council House, ceding more land to the United States. |
| c. 1817 | | The Cherokee-Osage War began in the Arkansas Territory. |
| 1817 | February | The American Board of Commissioners for Foreign Missions established Brainerd Mission, across the river from the town of Chickamauga, on land given to them by John McDonald, a former British agent to the Cherokee. Like the Moravian mission at Spring Place, the mission's most important feature was its school. |
| 1818 | Spring | The Battle of Claremore Mound was fought in the Arkansas Territory, in which a force of Cherokee, Shawnee, and Lenape attacked the Osage villages of Pasona and Pasuga in retaliation for raids against farms and horse theft. |
| c. 1819 | | Disgruntled Arkansas Cherokees, led by The Bowl and later Chief Richard Fields, emigrated to Texas in Spanish Mexico, and in what is now Rusk County, Texas. |
| 1819 | February 27 | The Cherokee signed another Treaty of Washington which ceded further land and in exchange Cherokee families would receive 640 acres of land and financial compensation for any improvements they had made to the ceded land. |
| 1819 | March | After the most recent treaty in Washington, D.C. was signed, John Walker stormed into the room of John Ross and attempted to knife him. |
| c. 1820 | | John Jolly succeeded his brother Ataluntiski as principal chief of the Cherokee Nation West. The National Council in Cherokee Nation East established eight judicial districts with courts in each to handle civil disputes. These districts also served for elections and legislative matters. |
| c. 1822 | | The Cherokee Supreme Court was established. |
| 1822 | November 8 | The Cherokee band of The Bowl signed the Treaty of San Antonio de Bexar with the Spanish governor of Texas, granting them land. However, the treaty was never ratified by the Viceroyalty of New Spain or its successor states, the Mexican Empire and the Republic of Mexico. |
| c. 1823 | | Sequoyah emigrated to the Cherokee Nation West. The last battle between the Cherokee and the Osage in the Arkansas Territory took place, after which both nations agreed to an end to hostilities. |
| c. 1824 | | Influenced by the teachings of the Seneca prophet Handsome Lake, Whitepath led a protest movement of traditionalists against acculturation, forming its own council under Big Tiger. This schism lasted four years. After years of legal action and negotiations over rights to land within the bounds of North Carolina, the Cherokee living outside the territory of the Cherokee Nation were confirmed in their lands, the center of which was Quallatown on the Oconaluftee River. Yonaguska was chosen as their principal chief. |
| c. 1825 | | Census figures for the Cherokee Nation East counted 13,563 Cherokees, 1,277 slaves, and 220 intermarried whites. |
| c. 1826 | | Whitepath was removed from the Cherokee National Council, but was reinstated two years later when the schism collapses. |
| 1826 | December | Pathkiller was succeeded as principal chief by his assistant, Charles Hicks. |
| 1827 | January | Pathkiller dies, followed two weeks later by Charles Hicks; government devolves to Major Ridge, as Speaker of the National Council, and John Ross, as president of the National Committee. William Hicks would later be selected as the next principal chief. |
| 1827 | July 26 | The Cherokee Nation East adopted a constitution with a three-branch government with a bicameral legislature and eight legislative-judicial districts. |
| c. 1828 | | Gold was discovered in Cherokee land near Dahlonega on Ward's Creek, a tributary of the Chestatee River. |
| 1828 | February 21 | Elias Boudinot began publication of the Cherokee Phoenix at New Echota. |
| 1828 | May 6 | The Cherokee signed another Treaty of Washington, ceding its lands in the Arkansas Territory in exchange for lands in what later becomes Indian Territory; many individual Cherokee remain for some time in Arkansas. |
| 1828 | October | Elections were held under the new constitution of the Cherokee Nation East, resulting in the election of John Ross as principal chief and George Lowery as assistant principal chief. Major Ridge was appointed as Ross's chief counselor. |
| c. 1829 | | The states of Georgia and Alabama passed acts appropriating the lands of the Cherokee Nation within their state limits. The Georgia act nullified the laws of the Cherokee Nation and prohibited Cherokees from testifying in court against whites. |

== 1830s ==
=== 1830–1832 ===
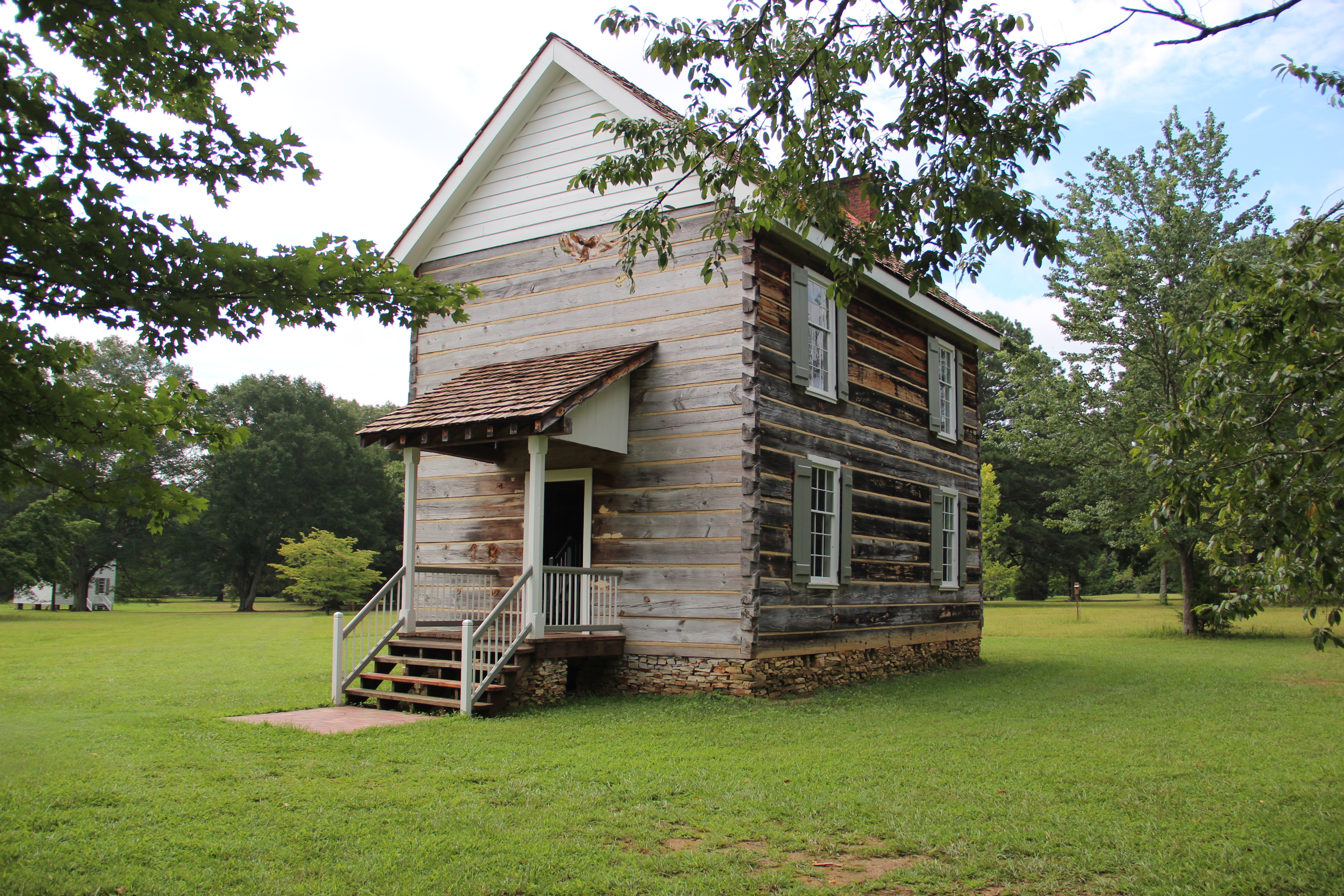
The New Echota Council House. The building in this photo is a reconstruction of the original Council House.

| Year | Date | Event |
|---|---|---|
| c. 1830 | | 561 Cherokee voluntary emigrated to western lands. |
| 1830 | January 4 | A party of thirty warriors under Major Ridge expelled several families of white squatters on Cherokee farmsteads in a detached section of Cherokee land inside southern Georgia. |
| 1830 | June 3 | Governor George Rockingham Gilmer declared the Georgia legislative act of the previous December to be in effect, claiming all Cherokee lands, including gold mines, for the state. |
| 1830 | May 28 | Congress passed the Indian Removal Act, directed at the "Five Civilized Tribes," including the Cherokee. |
| 1830 | October | The Cherokee Nation held its National Council meeting at New Echota for the last time. John Ridge was elected president of the National Committee, Going Snake the Speaker of the Council, and Alexander McCoy the council clerk. Ridge, William Shorey Coody (Ross's nephew), and Richard Taylor were chosen to lead a delegation to Washington to protest mistreatment of the Nation. |
| c. 1831 | | The state of Georgia passed a law requiring whites living within the Cherokee Nation to swear a loyalty oath and to obtain permission from the state in order to continue living there. The law was primarily directed at missionaries, particularly those at the Brainerd Mission. |
| 1831–1832 | January–December | 907 Cherokee emigrated to western lands in these two years, mostly in two parties of 347 and 422, including 127 slaves in the latter. |
| 1831 | February 24 | The Choctaw sign the Treaty of Dancing Rabbit Creek, ceding most of their land to the United States. Some chose to remain in Mississippi and become US citizens subject to state law. Their descendants in the 20th century organize as the federally recognized Mississippi Band of Choctaw. |
| 1831 | September 15 | Eleven white men were tried in Lawrenceville, Georgia for failing to obtain a state permit for residency in Cherokee territory. The jury found the men guilty, and the judge sentenced each to four years of hard labor. Upon their arrival at the prison in Milledgeville, Governor Gilmer offered to pardon them if they agreed to take the loyalty oath and leave the state; nine of them agreed. Missionaries Elizur Butler and Samuel Worcester refused, and later took their case to the Supreme Court. |
| 1831 | December | A delegation from the Cherokee Nation East, composed of John Ridge, Elias Boudinot, James Martin, and William Shorey Coody, arrived in Washington to present Cherokee grievances against the state of Georgia. |
| 1832 | March 3 | In the case of Worcester v. Georgia, Chief Justice John Marshall of the Supreme Court struck down the recent laws of the state of Georgia, ruling that the Cherokee Nation East have the right to protection of the federal government from harassment by the states, who have no criminal jurisdiction in Indian territory. The court also ordered the release of Worcester and Butler. A month later, President Jackson told the Cherokee delegation he would not enforce the ruling. |
| 1832 | March 24 | The Muscogee signed the Treaty of Cusseta, with the United States. The treaty provides an exchange of lands for those Muscogee who chose to emigrate to Indian Territory, and individual ownership of current lands with submission to Alabama state laws for those who did not. After violence broke out from speculators defrauding the Muscogee of their land, the federal government sent General Winfield Scott to forcibly remove the Muscogee. |
| 1832 | April 16 | Secretary of War Lewis Cass met with the Cherokee delegation and offers them extensive lands in Indian Territory, sovereignty over their affairs there, an annuity of equal value to their ceded lands, payment for improvements to ceded lands, support for schools and industries, and various other incentives for the ceding of their lands in the east. |
| 1832 | May 9 | A small faction of Seminole in favor of removal signed the Treaty of Payne's Landing the United States. The Senate did not ratify it for two years. |
| 1832 | July 23 | The Cherokee National Council met for the first time at Red Clay. They passed a resolution to allow current officers to continue, including John Ross as Principal Chief. Boudinot resigned as editor of The Cherokee Phoenix after Ross refused to allow him to publish a report of the recent delegation to Washington in favor of removal; he was replaced by Elijah Hicks, one of Ross's brothers-in-law. These divisions in the nation later led to the Treaty Party and the National Party. |
| 1832 | October 20 | The Chickasaw signed the Treaty of Pontotoc with the United States, ceding their land east of the Mississippi in exchange for financial compensation and equal lands in Indian Territory. The United States did not pay the promised amount for 30 years. |
| 1832 | October 22 | Georgia began the Land Lottery to allocate the lands seized from the Cherokee. |

=== 1833–1835 ===
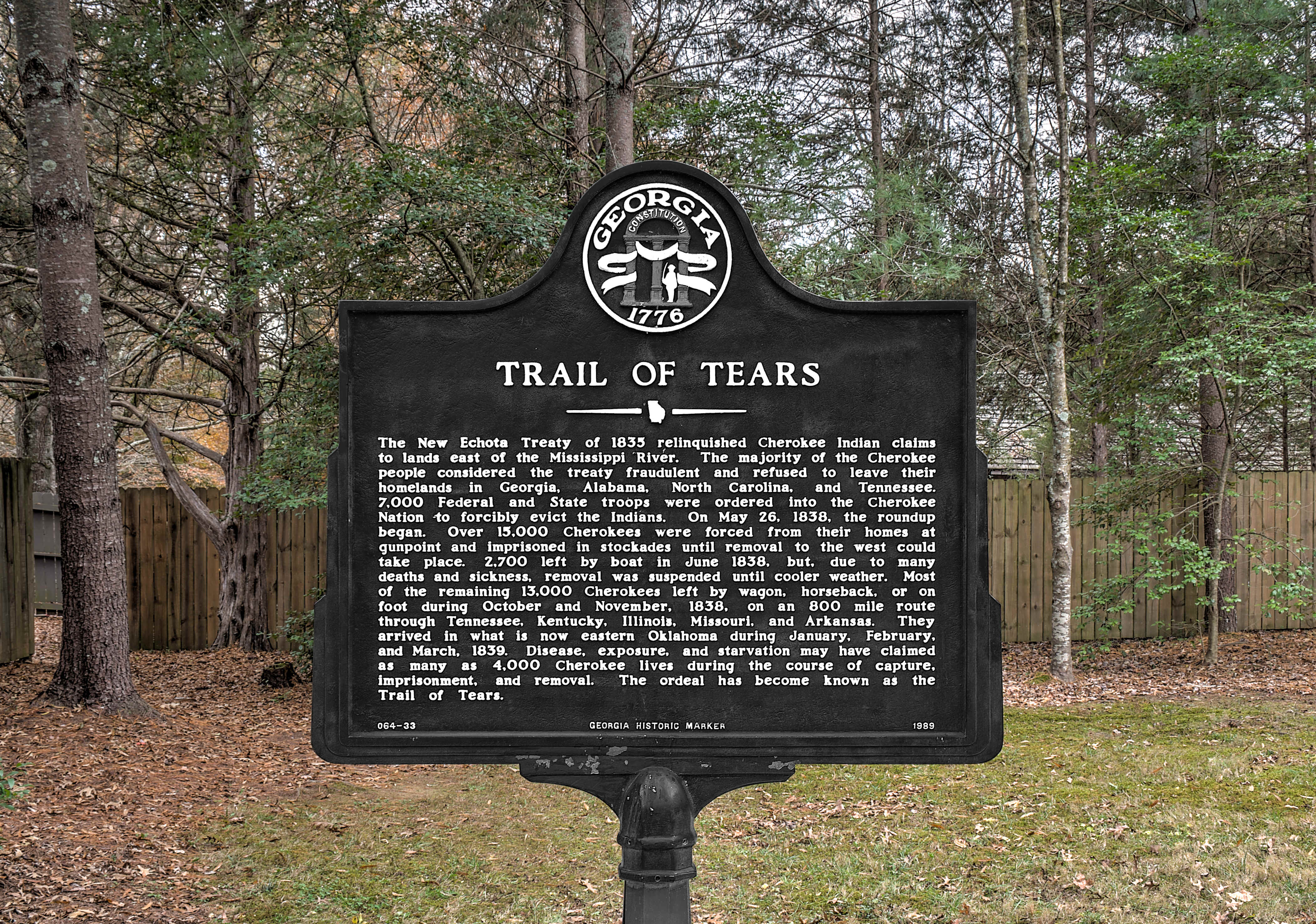
Detail of memorial at New Echota

| Year | Date | Event |
|---|---|---|
| c. 1833 | | Tatsi led a party to join the Texas Cherokee in what was then Mexico. Among the party was Sam Houston, adopted son of John Jolly. |
| 1833 | February | President Jackson offered John Ross $3 million and equivalent land in the west for the removal of the Cherokee Nation East; Ross refused. |
| 1833 | February 14 | The Treaty of Fort Gibson corrected conflicts between land guarantees to the Cherokee and to the Muscogee. |
| 1833 | November | A group of Cherokee who decided to emigrate, including most of the Treaty Party, met the Cherokee Agency at Calhoun, Tennessee, where they elected William Hicks as principal chief of their faction and John McIntosh as his assistant. They sent a delegation including Andrew Ross to Washington to represent their interests. |
| 1834 | March 13 | Lieutenant Joseph Harris departed from the Cherokee Agency with an emigration party. With new arrivals along the way, the party eventually numbered 903. |
| 1834 | Spring | John Ross proposed to Secretary Cass that the Nation be allowed to remain in the East on a small part of their land, subject to the laws of the states, with a goal of eventually assimilating into American society. His brother Andrew, on the other hand, signed a removal treaty with terms so poor, even advocates of removal boycotted it. Major Ridge condemned both extremes, citing to John Ross the extreme destitution of the Catawba, who followed a similar course. |
| 1834 | May 16 | Harris's party arrived at the Cherokee Nation West. An epidemic of typhus had killed 120 of the party along the way. |
| 1834 | June 19 | The United States concluded the treaty with Andrew Ross, over the objections of Ross, Ridge, and their allies. The treaty was rejected by the United States Senate and the Cherokee National Council. |
| 1834 | June 24 | John Walker, Jr., a leading advocate of removal, was assassinated by James Foreman and his half-brother Anderson Springston while returning home from a meeting of the National Council. |
| 1834 | August | Elijah Hicks presented to the National Council a petition charging Major Ridge, John Ridge, and David Vann with treason, calling for their impeachment and removal from office. They were never tried, although the charged were never dropped. |
| 1834 | November 27 | The Treaty Party holds its own council at Running Waters, the plantation of John Ridge, not far from Oothcaloga (present day Calhoun, Georgia). |
| c. 1835 | | Census of the Cherokee Nation estimated 5000 Cherokee in the west counted the following people in the east: Georgia: 8946 Indians, 776 slaves, 68 whites; North Carolina: 3644 Indians, 37 slaves, 22 whites (this excluded the Oconaluftee under Yonaguska in Haywood County, North Carolina, who were considered state citizens); Tennessee: 2528 Indians, 480 slaves, 79 whites; and Alabama: 1424 Indians, 299 slaves, 32 whites; Total: 16,542 Indians, 1592 slaves, and 201 whites (18,335 people) |
| 1835 | March 14 | US envoy John F. Schermerhorn offered the Ridge delegation $3.25 million for the lands of the Cherokee Nation East. The Ross delegation countered with a demand of $20 million, which was rejected outright. The delegation promised to accept an amount set by the US Senate. The Senate almost immediately offered $5 million but the Ross delegation rejected it. Schermerhorn eventually concluded a preliminary treaty delegation offering $4.5 million plus other financial considerations. |
| 1835 | July 18 | Hundreds of Cherokee from both internal parties converged on John Ridge's plantation Running Waters, a few miles from New Echota, to meet with Shermerhorn, Return J. Meigs, Jr., and other officials representing the United States. Following the conclave, members of the National Party began murdering members of the Treaty Party at least weekly. |
| 1835 | August 24 | John Ridge held a Green Corn Dance at Running Waters attended by hundreds, primarily to build support for a removal treaty. John Ross attempts to hold dances elsewhere in opposition, but the Georgia Guard dispersed them. |
| 1835 | October | The Cherokee Council rejected the treaty offered in March. The council appoints twenty men, including John Ross and treaty advocates John Ridge, Charles Vann, and Elias Boudinot (later replaced by Stand Watie), to represent the Cherokee Nation for a new treaty with compensation over $5 million. Schermerhorn, meanwhile, called for a convention to negotiate a removal treaty at New Echota in December. |
| 1835 | November 7 | The Georgia Guard invaded present day southeast Tennessee, crossing its state line to arrest John Ross at his house, where they also found and arrested John Howard Payne. Ross was released nine days later and immediately headed to Washington, but Payne was held for an additional three days. |
| 1835 | December 22 | Approximately 400 Cherokee converged on New Echota for treaty negotiations. |
| 1835 | December 29 | After a week of negotiations, most of the Cherokee negotiators approved the Treaty of New Echota, ceding their remaining land in the east in exchange for $5 million, with an additional half-million dollars for education, perpetual rights to equal land in the Indian Territory, and compensation for property left in the east. An additional clause allowed Cherokee not wishing to move would be allowed to remain and become citizens of the states in which they resided, but President Jackson struck this clause. John Ross refused to sign, and returned to the Cherokee Nation, implying to his supporters that he had worked out a deal with the government allowing the Cherokee to remain, under his leadership.(Brown, p. 498–499) |

=== 1836–1837 ===
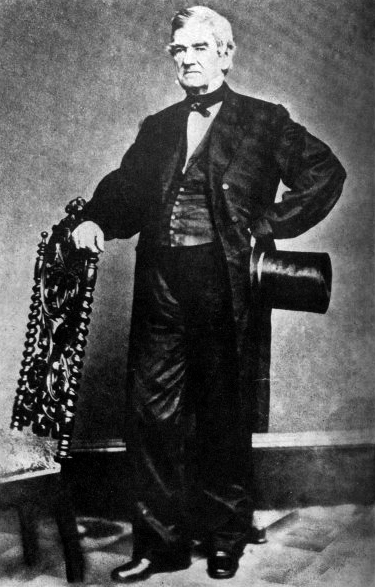
John Ross in suit with top hat.

| Year | Date | Event |
|---|---|---|
| 1836 | February | The Cherokee National Council, meeting at Red Clay, overwhelmingly rejected the Treaty of New Echota. |
| 1836 | February 23 | The Texas Cherokees and twelve associated tribes signed the Treaty of Bowles Village with the Republic of Texas, granting them nearly 1,000,000 acres (4,000 km^{2}) of east Texas land. |
| 1836 | March 2 | The Republic of Texas declared independence from Mexico, as the Mexican army under President-General Antonio Lopez de Santa Anna began waging a war of retribution. Sam Houston, President of the Provisional Government of Texas, signed a treaty with the Texas Cherokee guaranteeing their lands, but the treaty was rejected by the Texas Senate in 1837. |
| 1836 | May 18 | The United States Senate ratified the Treaty of New Echota by a single vote. |
| 1836 | June | General John E. Wool led federal troops, with support from East Tennessee volunteers under Brigadier General R.G. Dunlap, into the Cherokee Nation to prevent disorder. |
| 1836 | September | Dunlap disbanded his brigade of volunteers and sent them home. |
| 1837 | January 1 | 600 members of the Treaty Party departed for the Cherokee Nation West. |
| 1837 | March 3 | The first party removed at the expense of the US government, composed of 466 people including the Ridge and Watie families, departed from Ross's Landing under Dr. John S. Young. |
| 1837 | March 28 | Dr. Young's party arrived at Fort Smith, Arkansas. Most of them refused to go further, but a few continued the next day to Fort Coffee in Indian Territory. |
| 1837 | July 1 | General Wool was relieved from duty in command of the troops among the Cherokee Nation East at his own request. Colonel William Lindsey succeeds him. |
| 1837 | September | At the invitation of the federal government, a delegation of Cherokee traveled to Florida to act as intermediaries between the Seminole and the government. The United States hoped the Cherokee would convince the Seminole to stop resisting removal, but the Cherokee delegation employed stalling tactics and left convinced of the wisdom of the Seminole position. |
| 1837 | October 14 | The second party voluntarily removed by the U.S. government, composed of 365 persons, left from the Cherokee Agency under B.B. Cannon. |
| 1837 | December 27 | Cannon's party arrived in the Cherokee Nation West. Eighteen people died along the way. |

=== 1838 ===
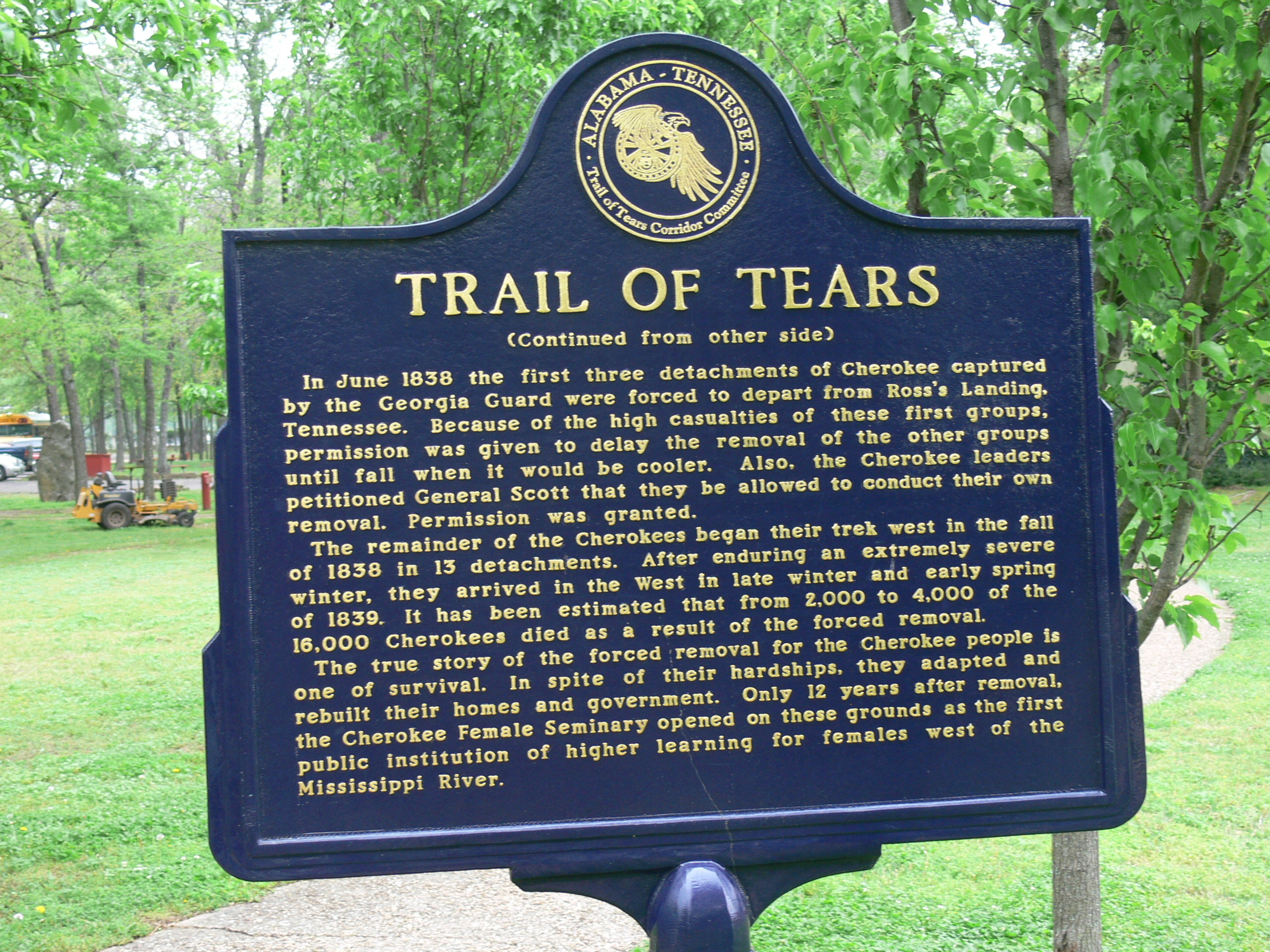
Trail of Tears memorial at Cherokee Heritage Centre (Tahlequah, Oklahoma)

| Date | Event |
|---|---|
| January 8 | The War Department reported that 2103 Cherokee had departed for the west, 1258 with their own resources. |
| May 8 | Major General Winfield Scott arrived in Charleston, Tennessee, to supervise the erection of forts for troops and stockades for prisoners throughout the Cherokee Nation. |
| May 17 | General Scott ordered his troops to round them up the Cherokee and to enforce obedience to the Treaty of New Echota. |
| May 26 | Federal troops rounded up the Cherokee in Georgia, most of whom were crowded into Camp Cherokee at Ross's Landing. |
| June 4 | Federal troops rounded up the Cherokee in North Carolina, most of whom were sent to camps in Bradley County, Tennessee. |
| June 5 | Federal troops rounded up the Cherokee in Tennessee. |
| June 6 | The first group of forced exiles, numbering about 800, departed from Ross's Landing under Lieutenant Deas. The group took on additional members at Brown's Ferry. |
| June 12 | Federal troops rounded up the Cherokee in Alabama; detainees were held at Fort Payne. |
| June 13 | The second group of forced exiles, numbering about 875, departed from Ross's Landing under Lieutenant R.H.K. Whitely. |
| June 17 | The third group of forced exiles, numbering about 1070, departed from Ross's Landing. |
| June 19 | Lieutenant Deas's party arrived at Fort Smith, where most emigrants disembarked and refused to continue. Those who remained traveled to Fort Coffee the following day. General Scott granted the request from Ross and the National Council to suspend removal until better weather in the fall. Captain Drane refused to halt his group, which had left two days before, however. Scott estimated in his report that there were about 3000 detainees in the camps around the Cherokee Agency, 2500 at Ross's Landing, and 1250 at camps between them, with 2000–3000 at interior forts waiting to be moved to the camps and around 200 remaining to be captured. |
| July 12 | The boats from Lieutenant Whitely's party ran aground at Benson's Bar, and the party continued on land eight days later. |
| July 25 | General Scott agreed to the plan of Ross and the National Council for the Cherokee to supervise their own removal, accepting the bid of Ross and his brother Lewis to do so at a price of $65 per person. |
| August 1–7 | The last council meeting of the Cherokee Nation east of the Mississippi River was held at Aquohee Camp in present-day Bradley County, Tennessee, at the site now known as Rattlesnake Springs. |
| August 5 | Whitely's party arrived at the Cherokee Nation West with only 602 people remaining; 143 had escaped, and the rest (approximately 130) had died. |
| August 7 | Drane's party arrived in Bellefonte, Alabama with only 722 people remaining. About 100 had escaped before the party arrived, and another 300 escaped there, though many of the latter were recaptured. Seventy-six more escaped before the party reached Waterloo. |
| August 19 | The last communion was held at the Baptist Church of Christ at the Brainerd Mission. The missionaries subsequently accompany the Cherokee west. |
| August 28 | The party of Hair Conrad, including Goingsnake and treaty supporter William Shorey Coody, departed from the camp at Wildwood Spring. It crossed the Hiwassee and Tennessee Rivers before being forced to halt near the northern landing of Blythe's Ferry, due to a heavy drought making drinking water scarce. |
| September 1 | The party of Elijah Hicks, including Whitepath, departed from the camps around the Agency and followed the same path as Conrad's party, only to be likewise halted at Gunstocker Spring. |
| September 3 | The detachment of Jesse Bushyhead and Roman Nose departed from the camps around the Agency and followed the same route as the previous two, only to be halted before crossing the Tennessee River. General Scott halted emigration due to the drought in the Cumberland Mountains. |
| October | Traditionalist leader Whitepath died near Hopkinsville, Kentucky. |
| October 1 | The party of John Benge departed from Fort Payne. |
| October 3 | Hicks's and Conrad's parties resumed their journeys. The party of Richard Taylor departed from Ross's Landing. |
| October 11 | A detachment of 675 Treaty Party members under John A. Bell departed from the Agency, having refused removal under Ross. |
| November 1 | Twelve members of a group of twenty Cherokee in western North Carolina who had evaded round-up and forced emigration were captured and held under guard by three enlisted men and a lieutenant. During the night, two of the soldiers were killed and one wounded, while the lieutenant and the prisoners escaped. |
| November 7 | After seeing off the other parties on the land route, the party of John Drew, including the families of Lewis Ross and Joseph Vann, attempted to leave on a luxury riverboat, low water levels delayed them for a month. |
| November 23 | The fugitives of Tsali's band had all been captured except for Tsali himself. Three of them were executed by a firing squad composed of men from Yonaguska's Oconaluftee Cherokee and from Utsala's Nantahala Cherokee. |
| November 25 | Utsala's band captured Tsali and executed him by firing squad. For their part in helping quell the rebellion, his Nantahala Cherokee were allowed to join Yonaguska's group. |
| December 28 | Death of John Jolly, Principal Chief of the Cherokee Nation West, died, and was succeeded by John Looney. |

=== 1839–1840 ===
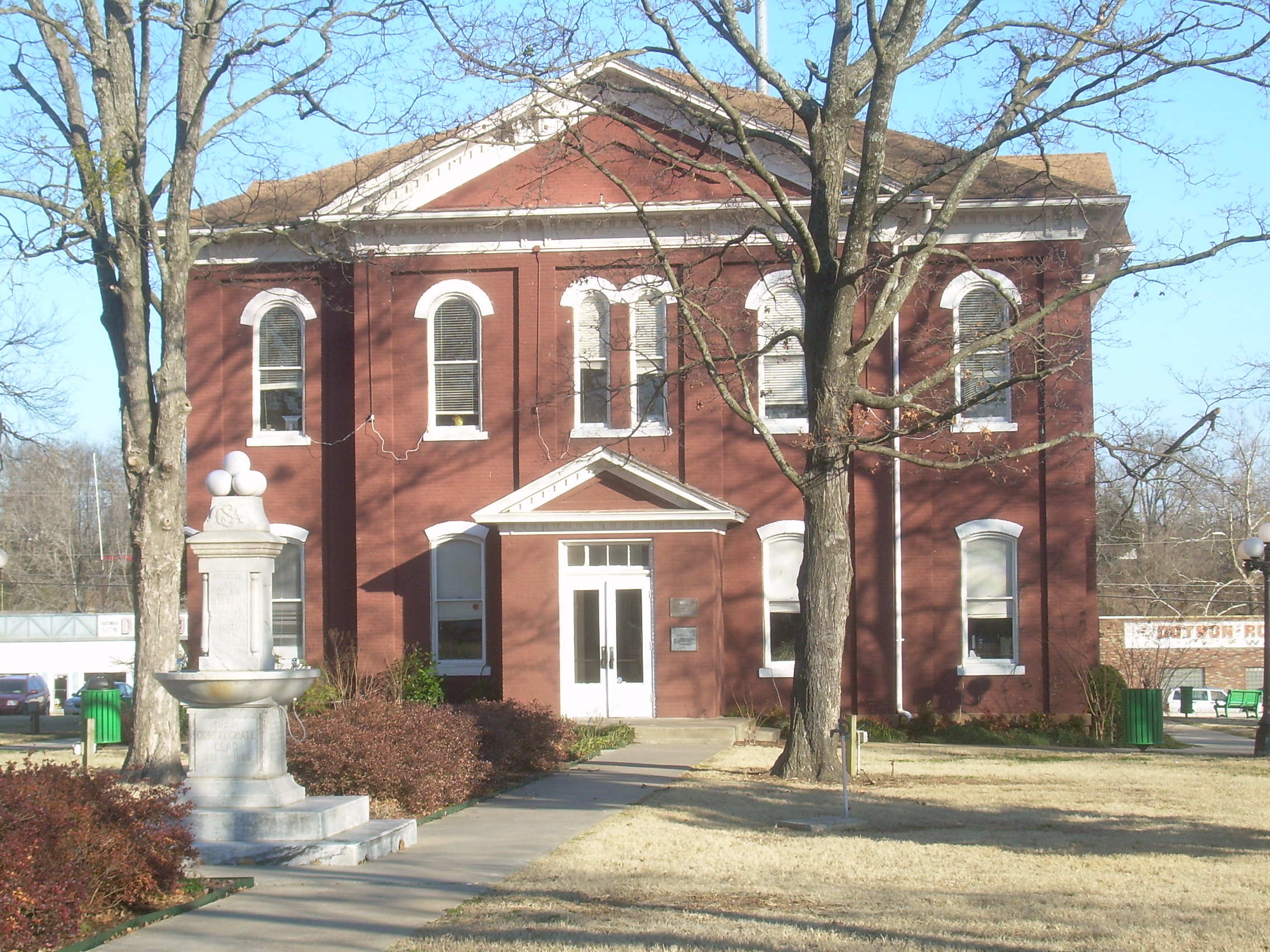
The Cherokee Nation Capitol Building and Courthouse, Tahlequah, Oklahoma. Built in 1869, it functioned as the political center of "The Nation" until 1907, and is the oldest public building standing in Oklahoma.

| Year | Date | Event |
|---|---|---|
| 1839 | January–March | Parties arrived at Fort Gibson, led by Elijah Hicks, John Bell, John Benge, Daniel Colton, Situwakee, Old Field, Jesse Bushyhead, Choowalooka, Moses Daniel, James Brown, George Hicks, John Drew, Richard Taylor, and Peter Hildebrand. |
| 1839 | April | Yonaguska, Principal Chief of the Eastern Band of Cherokee, died and his adopted son William Holland Thomas succeeded him. |
| 1839 | April 22 | The Cherokee Nation West, along with their new arrivals, held an election to select new officers. John Brown, formerly of Chattanooga area, was elected principal chief. |
| 1839 | June 22 | Ross supporters assassinated John Ridge, Elias Boudinot, and Major Ridge for ceding Cherokee lands. Another party attacked Stand Watie, but he fought back and escaped to Missouri Territory. Their deaths sparked the Cherokee Civil War, which lasted decades. |
| 1839 | July 15 | In the Battle of the Neches, the Republic of Texas under president Mirabeau Lamar attacked the Cherokee and killed over 100 of them, beginning the Texas Cherokee War. Many survivors left for the Cherokee Nation in Indian Territory. |
| 1839 | September 6 | Cherokee delegates meeting in the capital of Tahlequah signed a constitution for a reunited Cherokee Nation, and they elect Ross as principal chief. |
| 1839 | September 22 | The Commissioner of Indian Affairs reported to the Secretary of War that 1046 Cherokee remained in North Carolina; another 300 remain in Tennessee, Georgia, and Alabama. |
| 1839 | December 25 | The last battle of the Cherokee War with the Republic of Texas was fought. |
| 1840 | May 18 | Ross submitted claims against the US government for expenses of the removal. |

== 1841–present ==
| Year | Date | Event |
|---|---|---|
| 1842 | November | The Cherokee Slave Revolt occurred. |
| 1843 | March 31 | The Cherokee signed the Treaty of Bird's Fort with the Republic of Texas, ending hostilities among several Texas tribes, and, recognizing the tribal status of the Texas Indians. President Sam Houston signed for the Republic of Texas. |
| 1846 | August 6 | Three factions of the Cherokee Nation signed the Treaty of Washington, in an attempt to end open hostilities within the Nation. |
| c. 1862 | | Hidden divisions broke out when Ross led a third of the Cherokee Nation in breaking with the rest of the Nation over their support of the Confederacy during the Civil War. Ross's faction fled Cherokee lands for Washington and threw their support to the Union. The remaining two thirds elected Stand Watie as principal chief. |
| 1865 | September 8 | The Cherokee, along with eleven other tribes, signed the Treaty of Fort Smith with the United States. Among other provisions, it recognized the John Ross party as the sole legitimate representatives of the Cherokee Nation. US negotiators ignored the claims of Stand Watie, who had summoned his nephew John Rollin Ridge from California to negotiate recognition of a "Southern Cherokee Nation." |
| 1866 | July 19 | The Cherokee Nation signed the Treaty of Tahlequah with the United States, formally ending hostilities from the Civil War and reuniting the Nation. |
| 1868 | July 27 | Another Treaty of Washington was signed to supplement the Treaty of Tahlequah. |
| 1872 | April 15 | The Going Snake Massacre took place in the Cherokee Nation, partially caused by lingering disagreements between the two Cherokee factions from the Civil War. |
| 1887 | February 8 | The Dawes Act broke up tribal land holdings in Indian Territory, assigning it to separate households in individual allotments. The remainder of the land was declared surplus and sold it to American settlers. |
| 1898 | June 28 | The Curtis Act of 1898 abolished tribal constitutions and governments, in preparation the merger of Indian Territory with the Oklahoma Territory, to be admitted into the union as the state of Oklahoma. |
| c. 1902 | | In Eufaula, Indian Territory, various Indian nations including the Five Civilized Tribes began planning a separate state. |
| c. 1905 | | William Charles Rogers, Principal Chief of the Cherokee Nation, was impeached and deposed by the Cherokee National Council for being "too cooperative" with the federal government regarding the nation's dissolution. The council replaced him with Frank J. Boudinot, president of the Keetoowah Nighthawk Society, but the federal government reimposed Rogers in office the following year. |
| 1905 | August 21 | A constitutional convention met in Muskogee to draft a constitution for the proposed State of Sequoyah and appointed delegates to Washington. Their efforts were rejected by President Theodore Roosevelt, but the constitution served as a basis for that of the state of Oklahoma in 1906. |
| 1906 | March 3 | The Cherokee Nation was officially dissolved, although some aspects of its government was retained to deal with land issues. |
| 1914 | June 30 | The last vestiges of the government of the Cherokee Nation were dismantled. |
| 1950 | May 8 | The constitution, bylaws, and corporate charter of the United Keetoowah Band of Cherokee Indians were ratified in accordance with the Indian Reorganization Act of 1934 and the Oklahoma Indian Welfare Act of 1936. |
| c. 1963 | | Cherokee National Historical Society is founded in Tahlequah, Oklahoma |
| 1976 | June 26 | The constitution of the Cherokee Nation of Oklahoma, was ratified and the tribe gained federal recognition. It disfranchised the Texas Cherokee and Associated Bands, which had previously been represented on the national committee of the Cherokee Nation, and it recognized Cherokee Freedmen as historical members of the Nation. |
| c. 1980s | | The Cherokee Council redefined membership requirements as limited to those persons directly descended from Cherokee listed on the Dawes Rolls. As most Cherokee Freedmen were listed separately, even if descended from Cherokee, these definitions disfranchised them. In 1988, a federal court upheld the right of the Nation to determine citizenship. |
| 2003 | July 26 | The electorate of the Cherokee Nation approved a new constitution. |
| 2004 | September 26 | Lucy Allen, a descendant of the Cherokee Freedmen, files a lawsuit with the Cherokee Nation Supreme Court, in which it is alleged that acts barring the descendants of the Freedmen from membership are unconstitutional. |
| c. 2005 | | The UKB Department of Language, History and Culture is formed to perpetuate the history of the Keetoowah Cherokee People. |
| 2006 | March 7 | The Cherokee Nation Judicial Appeal Tribunal ruled that the Cherokee Freedmen were eligible for Cherokee citizenship. |
| 2007 | March 3 | The Cherokee electorate, excluding freedmen descendants, passed a constitutional amendment limiting citizenship to those Cherokee on the Dawes Rolls listed as Cherokee by blood, plus Shawnee and Delaware. |
| 2011 | January 14 | The Tribal District Court ruled that the 2007 constitutional amendment was invalid because it conflicted with the 1866 treaty guaranteeing the freedmen's rights. |
| c. 2012 | | The United Keetoowah Band of Cherokee shows a total population of 14,300 persons. The Eastern Band of Cherokee Indians has roughly 12,500 members. At this time there are lawsuits and counter lawsuits in the Cherokee Freedmen issue in the Cherokee Nation. With an estimated 284,247 members, per the 2010 census, the Cherokee Nation is the second largest Indian tribe behind the Navajo. Combined there are over 800,000 persons identifying as being, at least partially, Cherokee. |

== See also ==
- Cherokee Freedmen
- Cherokee removal
- Cherokee treaties
- Daniel Sabin Butrick (Buttrick), traveled with the Cherokee Nation on the Trail of Tears
- Eastern Band of Cherokee Indians
- Principal Chiefs of the Cherokee
- Trail of Tears

== Bibliography ==
- Alderman, Pat. Dragging Canoe: Cherokee-Chickamauga War Chief. (Johnson City: Overmountain Press, 1978).
- Anderson, William L. Cherokee Removal: Before and After. (Athens: University of Georgia Press, 1992).
- Baker, Jack, transcriber. Cherokee Emigration Rolls 1817–1835. (Oklahoma City: Baker Publishing Co., 1977).
- Blankenship, Bob. Cherokee Roots, Volume 1: Eastern Cherokee Rolls. (Cherokee: Bob Blankenship, 1992).
- Brown, John P. Old Frontiers: The Story of the Cherokee Indians from Earliest Times to the Date of Their Removal to the West, 1838. (Kingsport: Southern Publishers, 1938).
- Eckert, Allan W. A Sorrow in Our Heart: The Life of Tecumseh. (New York: Bantam, 1992).
- Ehle, John. The Trail of Tears: The Rise and Fall of the Cherokee Nation. (New York: Doubleday, 1989).
- Evans, E. Raymond. "Notable Persons in Cherokee History: Ostenaco". Journal of Cherokee Studies, Vol. 1, No. 1, pp. 41–54. (Cherokee: Museum of the Cherokee Indian, 1976).
- Evans, E. Raymond. "Notable Persons in Cherokee History: Bob Benge". Journal of Cherokee Studies, Vol. 1, No. 2, pp. 98–106. (Cherokee: Museum of the Cherokee Indian, 1976).
- Evans, E. Raymond. "Notable Persons in Cherokee History: Dragging Canoe". Journal of Cherokee Studies, Vol. 2, No. 2, pp. 176–189. (Cherokee: Museum of the Cherokee Indian, 1977).
- Evans, E. Raymond, and Vicky Karhu. "Williams Island: A Source of Significant Material in the Collections of the Museum of the Cherokee". Journal of Cherokee Studies, Vol. 9, No. 1, pp. 10–34. (Cherokee: Museum of the Cherokee Indian, 1984).
- Finger, John R. The Eastern Band of Cherokees 1819–1900. (Knoxville: University of Tennessee Press, 1984).
- Foreman, Grant. Indian Removal: The Emigration of the Five Civilized Tribes of Indians. (Norman: University of Oklahoma Press, 1932).
- Haywood, W.H. The Civil and Political History of the State of Tennessee from its Earliest Settlement up to the Year 1796. (Nashville: Methodist Episcopal Publishing House, 1891).
- King, Duane, ed. The Cherokee Indian Nation: A Troubled History. (Knoxville: University of Tennessee Press, 1979).
- King, Duane, and E. Raymond Evans. "The Trail of Tears: Primary Documents of the Cherokee Removal". Journal of Cherokee Studies, Vol. 3, No. 3, pp. 130–190. (Cherokee: Museum of the Cherokee Indian, 1978).
- Klink, Karl, and James Talman, ed. The Journal of Major John Norton. (Toronto: Champlain Society, 1970).
- Lumpkin, Wilson. The Removal of the Cherokee Indians from Georgia. (New York: Augustus M. Kelley, 1907).
- McLoughlin, William G. Cherokee Ghost Dance Movement of 1811–1813. (Macon: Mercer University Press, 1984).
- McLoughlin, William G. Cherokee Renascence in the New Republic. (Princeton: Princeton University Press, 1992).
- Mooney, James. Myths of the Cherokee and Sacred Formulas of the Cherokee. (Nashville: Charles and Randy Elder-Booksellers, 1982).
- Moore, John Trotwood and Austin P. Foster. Tennessee, The Volunteer State, 1769–1923, Vol. 1. (Chicago: S. J. Clarke Publishing Co., 1923).
- Moulton, Gary E., ed. The Papers of John Ross, Cherokee Chief. (Athens: The University of Georgia Press, 1978).
- Ramsey, James Gettys McGregor. The Annals of Tennessee to the End of the Eighteenth Century. (Chattanooga: Judge David Campbell, 1926).
- Royce, Charles. The Cherokee Nation of Indians. (Chicago: Aldine Publishing Company, 1975).
- Starr, Emmet. Starr's History of the Cherokee Indians. (Fayetteville: Indian Heritage Assn., 1967).
- White, R. C. Cherokee Indian Removal from the Lower Hiwassie Valley. (Cleveland: Cleveland State Community College Press, 1973).
- Wilkins, Thurman. Cherokee Tragedy: The Ridge Family and the Decimation of a People.. (New York: Macmillan Company, 1970).
