= John Ross (Cherokee chief) =

1st principal chief of the Cherokee Nation

- ᎫᏫᏍᎫᏫ
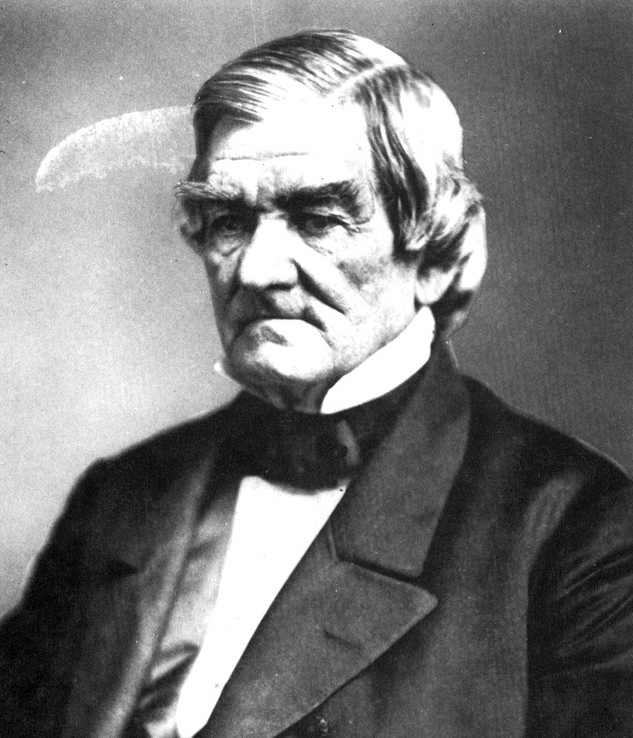
- Ross, c. 1866

Cherokee Nation Principal Chief
- In office 1828–1862
- Preceded by: William Hicks
- Succeeded by: Stand Watie

Personal details
- Born: October 3, 1790 Turkeytown, Alabama
- Died: August 1, 1866 (aged 75) Washington, D.C.
- Resting place: Ross Cemetery, Cherokee County, Oklahoma
- Spouse(s): Quatie Brown Henley (m. c. 1812–1839); Mary Brian Stapler (m. 1844–1865)
- Relations: Great-granddaughter Mary G. Ross; Nephew William P. Ross; Niece Mary Jane (Ross) Ross
- Children: 7
- Known for: opposition to Treaty of New Echota; Trail of Tears; Union supporter during American Civil War

John Ross (Cherokee: ᎫᏫᏍᎫᏫ, romanized: Guwisguwi, lit. 'Mysterious Little White Bird'; October 3, 1790 – August 1, 1866) was the Principal Chief of the Cherokee Nation from 1828 to 1866; he served longer in that position than any other person. Ross led the nation through such tumultuous events as forced removal to Indian Territory and the American Civil War. Ross was of Euro-Indigenous American descent. His father was a European man from the Scottish Highlands. His mother was a Euro-Indigenous American woman from the Cherokee Nation.

Ross's parents sent him for formal schooling to institutions that served other bicultural Cherokee people. At the age of twenty, Ross was appointed as a US Indian agent in 1811. During the War of 1812, he served as adjutant of a Cherokee regiment under the command of European-American general, Andrew Jackson. After the end of the Red Stick War, Ross started a tobacco plantation in Tennessee. In 1816, he built a warehouse and trading post on the Tennessee River north of the mouth of Chattanooga Creek, and started a ferry service that carried passengers across the river. Concurrently, Ross developed a keen interest in Cherokee politics and attracted the attention of the Cherokee elders, especially Principal Chiefs Pathkiller and Charles R. Hicks. Together with Major Ridge, they became his political mentors.

Ross first went to Washington, DC, in 1816 as part of a Cherokee delegation to negotiate issues of national boundaries, land ownership, and white encroachment. As the only delegate fluent in English, Ross became the principal negotiator despite his relative youth. When he returned to the Cherokee Nation in 1817, he was elected to the National Council. He became council president in the following year. The majority of the council were Euro-Indigenous American men like Ross: wealthy, educated, English-speaking, and of mixed blood. In 1824, Ross boldly petitioned Congress for redress of Cherokee grievances, which made the Cherokee the first tribe ever to do so.

Both Pathkiller and Hicks died in January 1827. Hicks's brother, William, was appointed interim chief. Ross and Major Ridge shared responsibilities for the affairs of the tribe. Because William did not impress the Cherokee as a leader, they elected Ross as permanent principal chief in October 1828, a position that he held until his death.

The problem of removal split the Cherokee Nation politically. Ross, backed by the vast majority, tried repeatedly to stop white political powers from forcing the nation to move. He led a faction that became known as the National Party. Twenty others, who came to believe that further resistance would be futile, wanted to seek the best settlement they could get and formed the "Treaty Party," or "Ridge Party," led by Major Ridge. Treaty Party negotiated with the United States and signed the Treaty of New Echota on December 29, 1835, which required the Cherokee to leave by 1838. Neither Chief Ross nor the national council ever approved this treaty, but the US government regarded it as valid. The majority, about two-thirds of Cherokee people, followed the National Party and objected to and voted against complying with the Treaty of New Echota.

Forced removal spared no one, including Principal Chief Ross, who lost his first wife Quatie (Brown) Ross during the Trail of Tears.

Removal and the subsequent coordinated executions of Treaty Party signers Major Ridge, John Ridge, and former editor of the Cherokee Phoenix Elias Boudinot on June 22, 1839 thrust the Cherokee Nation into a civil war. Despite the Act of Union signed by Old Settlers, (Cherokees who removed west earlier under the Treaties of 1817 and 1819) and the Eastern Emigrants (those forced to remove under Ross's leadership) on July 12, 1839 and the new Cherokee Constitution that followed August 23, 1839, violent reprisals continued through 1846.

Cherokee people continued to elect Ross as Principal Chief through the Civil War Era. Ross hoped to maintain neutrality during the Civil War, but a variety of conditions prevented him from doing so. First, Stand Watie, a political opponent, Treaty Party member, kin to the Ridges, and Boudinot's brother raised a regiment on behalf of the Confederate army. Second, surrounding states seceded. Third, surrounding Native American nations signed treaties with the confederacy. Finally, federal troops abandoned the Indian Territory, leaving the Nation to defend itself in violation of treaty commitments. Rather than see the Cherokee Nation divided against itself again, Ross, with the consent of council, signed a treaty with the Confederacy.

For the Cherokee Nation, the Civil War represented the extended divisions created by Removal and the Trail of Tears. Ross supporters largely served under John Drew's regiment. Treaty Party supporters largely served under Stand Watie. During the war, federal troops arrested Ross and removed him from Indian Territory. Many Cherokee people less committed to the Confederacy and more committed to the Cherokee Nation refused to engage in battles against other Native American people, including those Muscogee Creek Native American people under Opothleyahola seeking refuge in Kansas.

Once outside the Indian Territory, Ross negotiated agreements with the Union for Cherokee support through Indian Home Guard Regiments. Many of those formerly fighting for the Confederacy but loyal to Ross, switched sides to support the Union through the Indian Home Guard.

Ross's absence from Indian Territory provided a political opening for Watie. While Ross was away, those loyal to Watie elected him Principal Chief. When Ross returned, an election was held re-electing him to the office. At those close of the war, those calling themselves the Southern Cherokees under Watie's leadership stepped forward as the rightful negotiators of any treaty, as did Ross as the elected chief.

The US required the Five Civilized Tribes to negotiate new peace treaties after the war. Ross made another trip to Washington, DC, for this purpose. Although Ross had negotiated with Lincoln during the war, his assassination enabled US commissioners to treat the Cherokee Nation as a defeated enemy. As Ross had feared, commissioners used the political divisions to extract greater penalties from the Cherokee Nation. Despite these setbacks, Ross worked to re-establish a unified Cherokee Nation and re-establish a nation-to-nation treaty with the US. He died in Washington, DC on August 1, 1866.

== Early life and education ==
House built in early 19th century by John McDonald, maternal grandfather of John Ross. Now called the "John Ross House", it was occupied by Ross's daughter and her husband, Nicholas Scales. It is located in Rossville, Georgia.

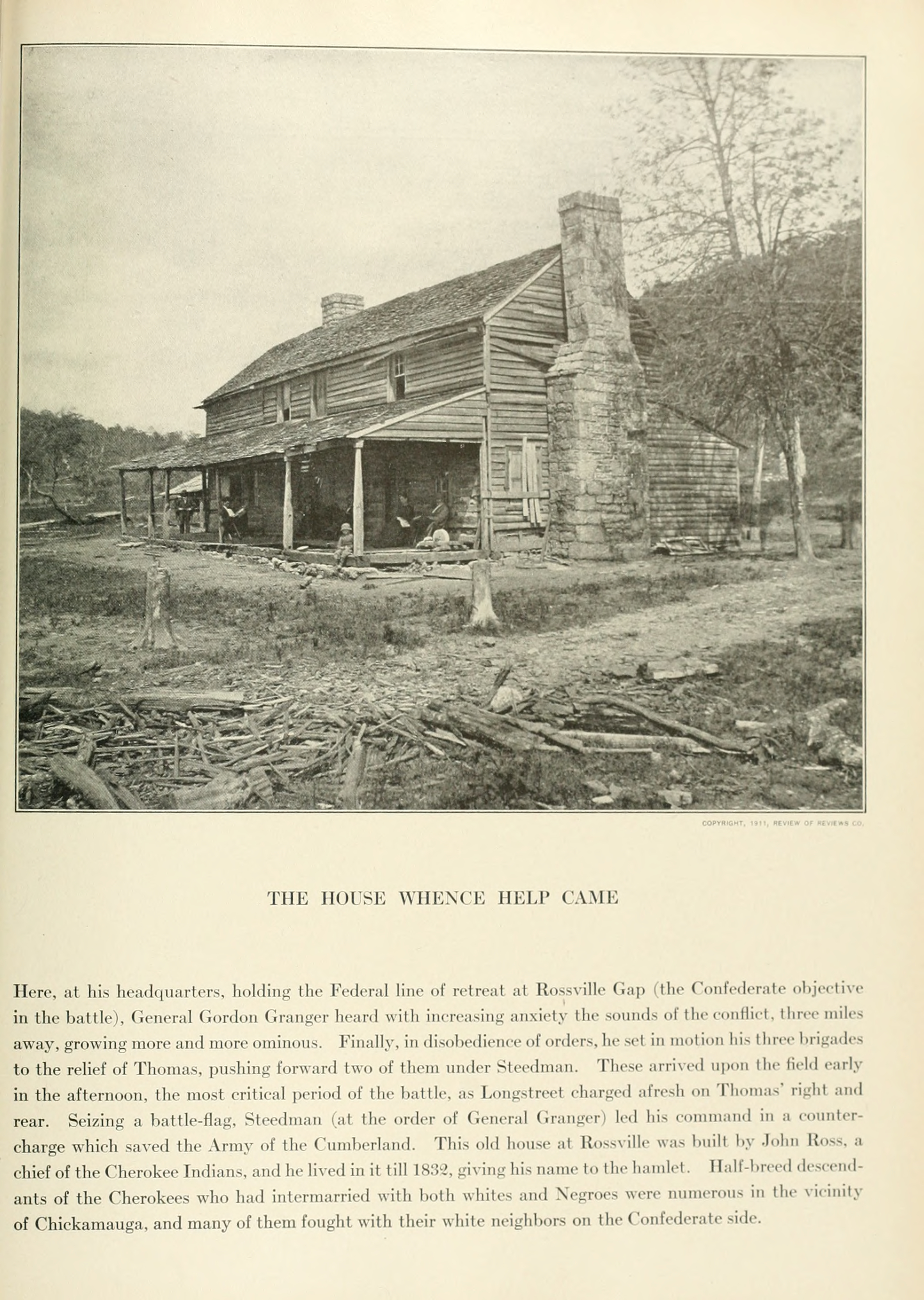
The John Ross House during the US Civil War

Ross (also known by his Cherokee name, Guwisguwi) was born in Turkeytown (in modern day Alabama), on the Coosa River, to Mollie (née McDonald) and her husband Daniel Ross, an immigrant Scots trader. His siblings who survived to adulthood included Jane Ross Coodey (1787–1844), Elizabeth Grace Ross Ross (1789–1876), Susannah "Susan" Ross Nave (1793-1867), Lewis Ross (1796–1870), Andrew 'Tlo-s-ta-ma' Ross (1798–1840), Margaret Ross Hicks (1803–1862), and Maria Ross Mulkey (1806–1838).

=== Genealogy ===
Ross was 1/8 Cherokee by blood. Under the matrilineal kinship system of the Cherokee, Ross and his siblings were considered born to his mother's family and Bird Clan. They gained their social status from her people. In such a system, typically the mother's eldest brother had a major role in the children's lives, especially for boys. His mother and grandmother were of mixed race (Euro-Indigenous American), but also considered part of their mother's Cherokee family and clan, and were brought up primarily in Cherokee culture.

Ross's great-grandmother Ghigooie, a full-blood Cherokee woman, had married William Shorey, a European interpreter from Scotland. Their daughter, Anna, married John McDonald, a Scots trader. (Note: In 1786 Anna and John's daughter, Mollie McDonald, married Daniel Ross, a Scots trader who had begun to live among the Cherokee during the American Revolution. Thus, Ross was one-eighth Cherokee and seven-eighths Scots. Anna's husband acquired a tract of land on Chickamauga Creek (near present-day Chattanooga) that became the site of Brainerd Mission in 1817.)

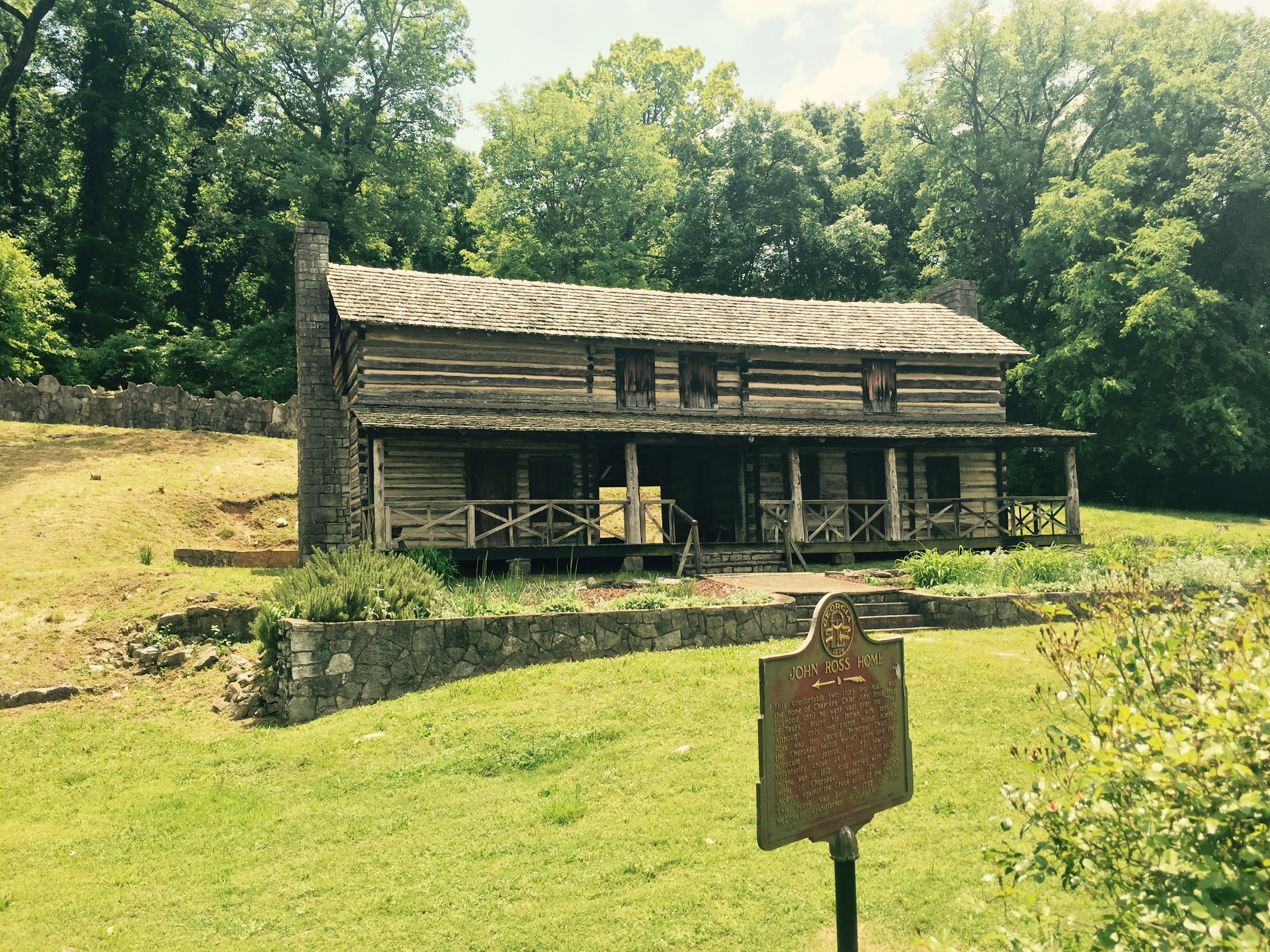
John Ross Home, Rossville, Georgia. The House was built in 1797 by John McDonald, grandfather of John Ross, and was Ross's home until he left on the "Trail of Tears".

=== Childhood and education ===
Ross spent his childhood with his parents near Lookout Mountain. Educated in English by White men in a frontier American environment, Ross spoke the Cherokee language poorly. His bi-cultural background and fluency in English enabled him to represent the Cherokee to the United States government. Many full-blood Cherokee frequented his father's trading company, so he encountered tribal members on many levels. As a child, Ross participated in tribal events, such as the Green Corn Festival.

The elder Ross insisted that John also receive a rigorous classical education. After being educated at home, Ross pursued higher studies with the Reverend Gideon Blackburn, who established two schools in southeast Tennessee for Cherokee children. Classes were in English and students were mostly of mixed race, like Ross. The young Ross finished his education at an academy in South West Point, near Kingston, Tennessee.

=== Bicultural Background of John Ross ===
Ross's life was not unlike those of other bicultural people in the northern United States and Canada. Many Cherokee people intermarried with Scottish traders during the eighteenth century. Scots and English fur traders in North America were typically men of social status and financial standing who married high-ranking Native American women. Both sides believed these were strategic alliances, helping both the American Indians and the traders. They educated their children in bi-cultural and multilingual environments. The bicultural children often married and rose to positions of stature in society, both in political and economic terms.

=== Family life ===
John Ross survived two wives and had several children. He married the widow Elizabeth "Quatie" (Brown) Henley (1791–1839) in 1812 or 1813. She was a Cherokee, born in 1791 and had one child from her marriage. Her late husband, Robert Henley, may have died during the War of 1812. Quatie Ross died in 1839 in Arkansas on the Trail of Tears as discussed below. She was survived by their children James McDonald Ross (1814–1864), William Allen Ross (1817–1891), Jane 'Jennie' Ross Meigs-Nave (1821–1894), Silas Dean Ross (1829–1872) and George Washington Ross (1830–1870).

John Ross remarried in 1844, to Mary Stapler (1826–1865), whom he survived by less than a year. Their surviving children were Annie Brian Ross Dobson (1845–1876) and John Ross Jr. (1847–1905).

== Careers ==
=== Indian agent ===
At the age of twenty, having completed his education and with bilingual skills, Ross received an appointment as US Indian agent to the western Cherokee and was sent to their territory (in present-day Arkansas). During the War of 1812, he served as an adjutant in a Cherokee regiment. He fought under General Andrew Jackson at the Battle of Horseshoe Bend against the British-allied Upper Creek warriors, known as the Red Sticks. They were traditionalists, who resisted the assimilationist tendencies of the Lower Creek. The latter had lived more closely with European-Americans and adopted some of their practices.

=== Businessman and founder of Chattanooga ===
Ross began a series of business ventures which made him among the wealthiest of all Cherokee. He derived the majority of his wealth from cultivating 170 acres (0.69 km^{2}) tobacco in Tennessee; it was the major commodity crop. He held about 20 slaves to cultivate and process this labor-intensive crop.

In 1816 he founded Ross's Landing, served by a ferry crossing. After the Cherokee were removed to Indian Territory in the 1830s, European settlers changed the name of Ross's Landing to Chattanooga. In addition, Ross had established a trading firm and warehouse. In total, he earned upwards of $1,000 a year ($18,971 in today's terms).

Under pressure from White settlers in Tennessee, many Cherokee migrated into northeast Georgia. In 1827 Ross moved to Rome, Georgia, to be closer to New Echota, the Cherokee capital. In Rome, Ross established a ferry along the headwaters of the Coosa River close to the home of Major Ridge, an older wealthy and influential Cherokee leader. By December 1836, Ross's properties were appraised at $23,665 ($693815 today). He was ranked as one of the five wealthiest men in the Cherokee Nation.

=== Political apprenticeship ===
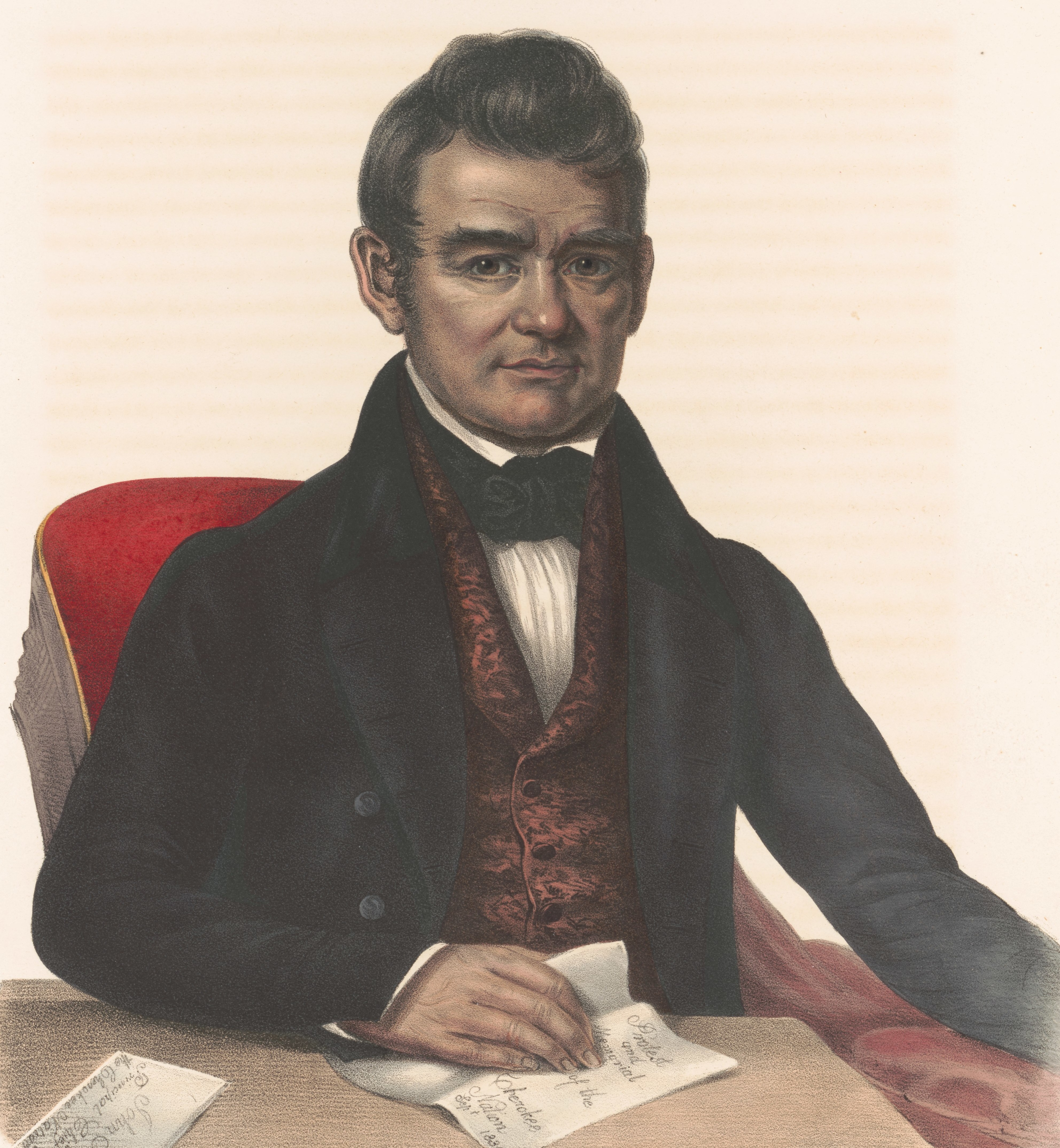
A young John Ross

Between 1811 and 1827, Ross learned how to conduct negotiations with the United States and acquire leadership skills to run a national government. After 1814, Ross's political career as a Cherokee legislator and diplomat progressed with the support of such individuals as the Principal Chief Pathkiller, Assistant Principal Chief Charles R. Hicks, and Casey Holmes, an elder statesman of the Cherokee Nation, as well as the women elders of his clan.

By 1813, as relations with the United States became more complex, older chiefs such as Pathkiller could not effectively defend Cherokee interests. Ross's ascent showed that Cherokee leaders recognized the importance of having formally educated, English-speaking leaders to represent them. Both Pathkiller and Hicks trained Ross, who served as their clerk and worked on all financial and political matters of the nation. They also steeped him in Cherokee tradition. In a series of letters to Ross, Hicks outlined known Cherokee traditions.

In 1816, the chief's council named Ross to his first delegation to European-American leaders in Washington, D.C. The delegation of 1816 was directed to resolve sensitive issues, including national boundaries, land ownership, and White encroachment on Cherokee land, particularly in Georgia. Only Ross was fluent in English, making him a central figure, although Cherokee society traditionally favored older leaders.

In November 1817, the Cherokee formed the National Council. Ross was elected to the thirteen-member body, where each man served two-year terms. The National Council was created to consolidate Cherokee political authority after General Andrew Jackson made two treaties with small cliques of Cherokee representing minority factions. Membership in the National Council placed Ross among the Cherokee ruling elite. The majority of the Euro-Indigenous American men were wealthy, and English-speaking. Most Cherokee still spoke only Cherokee.

=== President of the National Committee ===
In November 1818, just before the General Council meeting with U.S. Indian agent Joseph McMinn, who was assigned to deal with the Cherokee, Ross became president of the National Committee, a position he would hold through 1827. The Council selected Ross for that leadership position because they believed he had the diplomatic skills necessary to rebuff European-American requests to cede Cherokee lands. He soon refused McMinn's offer of $200,000 US, conditioned upon the Cherokee voluntarily removing to the west beyond the Mississippi.

In 1819, the Council sent Ross with a delegation to Washington, D.C. He assumed a larger leadership role. The delegation proposed to clarify the provisions of the Treaty of 1817—both to limit the ceded lands and clarify Cherokee right to the remaining lands. Secretary of War John C. Calhoun pressed Ross to cede large tracts of land in Tennessee and Georgia. Although he refused, the US government pressure continued and intensified. In October 1822, Calhoun requested that the Cherokee relinquish their land claimed by Georgia, in fulfillment of the United States' obligation under the Compact of 1802. Before responding to Calhoun's proposition, Ross first ascertained the sentiment of the Cherokee people. They were unanimously opposed to further cession of land.

In January 1824, Ross traveled to Washington to defend the Cherokee possession of their land. Calhoun offered two solutions to the Cherokee delegation: either relinquish title to their lands and remove west, or accept denationalization and become citizens of the United States. Rather than accept Calhoun's ultimatum, Ross directly petitioned Congress for the Cherokee cause on April 15, 1824. This fundamentally altered the traditional relationship between an Indian nation and the US government.

Never before had an Indian nation petitioned Congress with grievances. In Ross's correspondence, what had previously been the tone of petitions by submissive Indian Americans was replaced by assertive defenders. Ross was able to argue subtle points about legal responsibilities as well as Whites.

Some politicians in Washington recognized the change represented by Ross's leadership. Future president John Quincy Adams wrote, "[T]here was less Indian oratory, and more of the common style of white discourse, than in the same chief's speech on their first introduction." Adams specifically noted Ross as "the writer of the delegation" and remarked that "they [had] sustained a written controversy against the Georgia delegation with greate[sic] advantage." Georgia's delegation indirectly acknowledged Ross's skill: an editorial published in The Georgia Journal charged that "the Cherokee delegation's letters were fraudulent" because "too refined to have been written or dictated by an Indian".

== Principal Chief of the Cherokee Nation ==
In January 1827, Pathkiller, the Cherokee's principal chief and last hereditary chief, and, two weeks later, Charles R. Hicks, Ross's mentor, both died. Ross, as president of the National Committee, and Major Ridge, as speaker of the National Council, were responsible for the affairs of the tribe. In a letter dated February 23, 1827, to Colonel Hugh Montgomery, the Cherokee agent, Ross wrote that with the death of Hicks, he had assumed responsibility for all public business of The Nation. Charles Hicks's brother William served briefly as interim chief until a permanent chief could be elected. Although believing he was the natural heir to his brother's position, William Hicks had not impressed the tribe with his abilities. A majority of the people knew that during the year Ross, not Hicks, had taken care of all of the regular business of the tribe. On October 17, 1828, the Cherokee elected John Ross as principal chief.

Through the 1820s, the Cherokee Council passed a series of laws creating a bicameral national government, adopting structure from the US government. In 1822 they created the Cherokee Supreme Court, capping the creation of a three-branch government. In May 1827, Ross was elected to the twenty-four member constitutional committee. It drafted a constitution calling for a principal chief, a council of the principal chiefs, and a National Committee, which together would form the General Council of the Cherokee Nation, a constitutional republic. Although the constitution was ratified in October 1827, it did not take effect until October 1828, at which point Ross was elected principal chief. He was repeatedly reelected and held this position until his death in 1866. He was very popular, among both full-bloods, who comprised three-fourths of the population, and mixed-bloods.

The Cherokee had created a constitutional republic with delegated authority capable of formulating a clear, long-range policy to protect national rights.

=== Supreme Court litigation ===
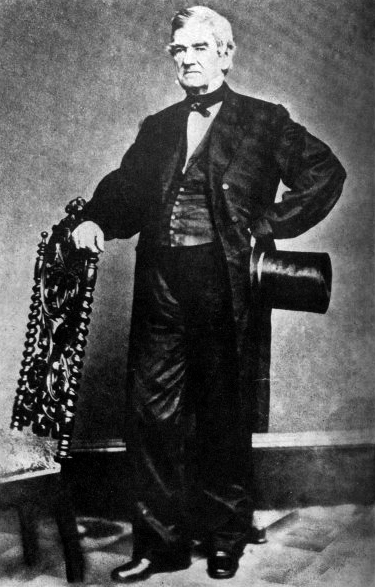
John Ross in suit with top hat.

Ross found support in Congress from individuals in the National Republican Party, such as senators Henry Clay (Kentucky), Theodore Frelinghuysen, and Daniel Webster (Massachusetts), and representatives Ambrose Spencer and David (Davy) Crockett. Despite this support, in April 1829, John H. Eaton, Secretary of War (1829–1831), informed Ross that President Jackson would support the right of Georgia to extend her laws over the Cherokee people.

On December 8, 1829, President Andrew Jackson made a speech announcing his intention to pass a bill through Congress by the following spring requiring Indian tribes living in the Southeastern states to move west of the Mississippi and cede their land claims in the East.

On December 19, 1829, the Georgia legislature, enacted a series of laws that greatly restricted the Cherokee Nation: they confiscated a large section of Cherokee occupied land, nullified Cherokee law within the confiscated area, banned further meetings of the Cherokee government in Georgia, declared contracts between Indians and whites null and void unless witnessed by two whites, disallowed Indians from testifying against a white person in court, and forbade Cherokee to dig for gold on their own lands. The laws were made effective June 1, 1830. These were calculated to force the Cherokee to move.

In May 1830, Congress endorsed Jackson's policy of removal by passing the Indian Removal Act. Jackson signed the Act on May 23. It authorized the president to set aside lands west of the Mississippi to exchange for the lands of the Indian nations in the Southeast. In the summer of 1830, Jackson urged the Cherokee, Chickasaw, Choctaw and Creek to sign individual treaties accepting removal from their homelands. The Cherokee refused to attend a meeting in Nashville that Jackson proposed. The other tribes signed off on Jackson's terms.

When Ross and the Cherokee delegation failed in their efforts to protect Cherokee lands through dealings with the executive branch and Congress, Ross took the radical step of defending Cherokee rights through the U.S. courts. In June 1830, at the urging of Senators Webster and Frelinghuysen, the Cherokee delegation selected William Wirt, US Attorney General in the Monroe and Adams administrations, to defend Cherokee rights before the U.S. Supreme Court.

Wirt argued two cases on behalf of the Cherokee: Cherokee Nation v. Georgia and Worcester v. Georgia. In Cherokee Nation v. Georgia, Chief Justice John Marshall acknowledged that the Cherokee were a sovereign nation, stating,

"[T]he Cherokees as a state, as a distinct political society, separated from others, capable of managing its own affairs and governing itself, has, in the opinion of a majority of the judges, been completely successful."

But he did not compel President Jackson to take action that would defend the Cherokee from Georgia's laws, because he did not find that the U.S. Supreme Court had original jurisdiction over a case in which a tribe was a party.

In 1832, the Supreme Court further defined the relation of the federal government and the Cherokee Nation. In Worcester v. Georgia, the Court found that Georgia could not extend its laws to the Cherokee Nation because that was a power of the federal government. Marshall stated that

"the acts of Georgia are repugnant to the Constitution, laws and treaties of the United States. They interfere forcibly with the relations established between the United States and the Cherokee nation, the regulation of which, according to the settled principles of our Constitution, are committed exclusively to the government of the Union."

The Cherokee were considered sovereign enough to legally resist the government of Georgia, and they were encouraged to do so.

The court maintained that the Cherokee Nation was dependent on the federal government, much like a protectorate state, but still a sovereign entity. But the dispute was made moot when federal legislation in the form of the Indian Removal Act exercised the federal government's legal power to handle the whole affair. The series of decisions embarrassed Jackson politically, as Whigs attempted to use the issue in the 1832 election. They largely supported his earlier opinion that the "Indian Question" was one that was best handled by the federal government, and not local authorities.

Meanwhile, the Cherokee Nation had encountered financial hard times. The U. S. government had stopped paying the agreed-upon $6,000 (~$213,190 in 2025) annuity for previous land cessions, Georgia had effectively cut off any income from the gold fields in Cherokee lands, and the Cherokee Nation's application for a federal government loan was rejected in February 1831. With great difficulty (and private donations), Ross was able to pay the Cherokee Nation's legal bills.

=== Ridge Party opposition ===
In a meeting in May 1832, Supreme Court Justice John McLean spoke with the Cherokee delegation to offer his views on their situation. McLean's advice was to "remove and become a Territory with a patent in fee simple to the nation for all its lands and a delegate in Congress, but reserving to itself the entire right of legislation and selection of all officers." He agreed to send Ross a letter explaining his views. Ross was furious, believing that this was a form of treachery.

McLean's advice precipitated a split within the Cherokee leadership as John Ridge and Elias Boudinot began to doubt Ross's leadership. John Ridge introduced a resolution at the national council meeting in October 1832 to send a delegation to Washington to discuss a removal treaty with President Jackson. The council rejected Ridge's proposal and instead selected Joseph Vann, John Baldridge, Richard Taylor, and John Ross to represent the Cherokee. In February 1833, Ridge wrote to Ross advocating that the delegation dispatched to Washington that month should begin removal negotiations with Jackson. Ridge and Ross did not have irreconcilable worldviews; neither believed that the Cherokee could fend off Georgian usurpation of Cherokee land. However, Ridge was furious that Ross had refused to consider Jackson's offer to pay the Cherokee $3,000,000 for all their lands in Georgia, Alabama and Tennessee.

In this environment, Ross led a delegation to Washington in March 1834 to try to negotiate alternatives to removal. Ross made several proposals; however, the Cherokee Nation may not have approved any of Ross's plans, nor was there reasonable expectation that Jackson would settle for any agreement short of removal. These offers, coupled with the lengthy cross-continental trip, indicated that Ross's strategy was to prolong negotiations on removal indefinitely. There was the possibility that the next President might be more favorably inclined.

Ross's strategy was flawed because it was susceptible to the United States' making a treaty with a minority faction. On May 29, 1834, Ross received word from John H. Eaton, that a new delegation, including Major Ridge, John Ridge, Elias Boudinot, and Ross's younger brother Andrew, collectively called the "Ridge Party" or "Treaty Party", had arrived in Washington with the goal of signing a treaty of removal. The two sides attempted reconciliation, but by October 1834 still had not come to an agreement. In January 1835 the factions were again in Washington. Pressured by the presence of the Ridge Party, Ross agreed on February 25, 1835, to exchange all Cherokee lands east of the Mississippi for land west of the Mississippi, asking for $20 million (~$658 million in 2025) dollars. He made it contingent on the General Council's accepting the terms.

=== Treaty of New Echota and Trail of Tears ===
Historical marker at the location of Ross' home in Bradley County, Tennessee

Secretary of War Lewis Cass believed this was yet another ploy to delay action on removal for an additional year, and threatened to sign the treaty with John Ridge. On November 7, 1835, Ross and his guest, John Howard Payne, were arrested by the Georgia guard at Ross' home in Flint Springs in Bradley County, Tennessee, and taken to Spring Place, Georgia, where they were imprisoned. On December 29, 1835, the Treaty Party signed the Treaty of New Echota with the U.S. Most Cherokee thought the signatories unauthorized. However, Ross could not stop its enforcement. Under orders from President Martin Van Buren, General Winfield Scott and 7,000 Federal troops forced removal of Cherokee who did not emigrate to the Indian Territory by 1838. This forced removal came to be known as the Trail of Tears. Accepting defeat, Ross convinced General Scott to allow him to supervise much of the removal process.

Returning to his home at Head of Coosa late at night, Ross saw a man he did not recognize at his house. He told the man to feed his horse and put him away for the night. Instead, the stranger followed him to the door, identified himself as Stephen Carter and told Ross that he now owned the property and had papers to prove it. Ross then learned agents of Georgia had given Carter possession of the house earlier in the week, after evicting his family. Dispossessed by Georgia (and Carter), Ross was now homeless. The next day, Ross found that family members had given his wife Quatie refuge. Quatie died of pneumonia on February 1, 1839, on the Arkansas River near Little Rock, while aboard a steamboat owned by her husband. According to a popular legend, derived from a letter written by a former soldier named John Burnett, fifty-two years after the fact, Quatie became ill after giving her coat to a child who was crying because of the cold. There is, however, almost no evidence to support the claim. Quatie was originally buried in the Little Rock town cemetery; her remains were later moved to Mt. Holly Cemetery.

There is a historical debate on whether or not the John G. Burnett Letter is a genuine artifact, or a forgery; contrary to some of the letter's implications, following the rounding up of the Cherokee at several collection points by the US Army under General Winfield Scott, the rest of the overland journey to Oklahoma was conducted without army oversight.

Because selling common lands was a capital crime under Cherokee law, treaty opponents assassinated Boudinot, Major Ridge and John Ridge after the migration to Indian Territory. Stand Watie, Boudinot's brother, was also attacked but he survived. The assassins were never publicly identified nor tried in court. General Matthew Arbuckle, commander of Fort Gibson, claimed he knew their identities but never tried to arrest them. Some Cherokee, particularly those tied to the pro-treaty party, claimed that Chief John Ross knew about the assassinations beforehand. Many years later, Chief Ross's son Allen, wrote that this was not so. Allen's letter, is said to be in the possession of the Oklahoma State Historical Society. Afterward, there were years of violence between the two factions.

Given the controversy over the struggle over territory and Ross's personal wealth, a vocal minority of Cherokee and a generation of political leaders in Washington considered Ross to be dictatorial, greedy, and an "aristocratic leader [who] sought to defraud" the Cherokee Nation. Ross also had influential supporters in Washington, including Thomas L. McKenney, the Commissioner of Indian Affairs (1824–1830). He described Ross as the father of the Cherokee Nation, a Moses who "led...his people in their exodus from the land of their nativity to a new country, and from the savage state to that of civilization."

=== Remarriage ===
John Ross was introduced to the Stapler family of Brandywine Springs, Delaware, by Thomas McKenney in 1841. Ross had many common interests with John Stapler, a merchant and widower. His eldest daughter, Sarah, cared for her younger siblings and befriended Ross. However, her younger sister, Mary Brian Stapler, developed a real love for Ross and initiated a romantic attachment in May 1844. As the time came for Ross to return to the Indian Territory, their mutual love ripened. They married in Philadelphia on September 2, 1844.

=== American Civil War ===
The Civil War divided the Cherokee people. At first the majority supported the Confederacy, which protected their slaveholdings. Fearing that joining the Confederacy would void the earlier Cherokee treaties with the United States, Ross tried to persuade his people to remain neutral in the conflict, but eventually most chose sides. Full-bloods tended to favor maintaining relations with the United States. This group included over two thousand members of a traditionalist and abolitionist society, the Keetoowah Society. Members of this group were called "Pins" by non-members because they wore an emblem of crossed pins on their shirts.

Ross advocated that the Cherokee Nation remain neutral. It was a losing argument. At a general assembly on August 21, 1861, Ross ended his speech by announcing that in the interests of tribal and inter-Indian unity it was time to agree on an alliance with the Confederate States of America. Many of the well-armed mixed bloods, especially the wealthy led by Stand Watie, supported the Confederacy. Traditionalists and Cherokee who opposed the institution of slavery remained loyal to the Union. However, the majority of Cherokee may not have understood the nature of the new treaty.

After Ross departed to meet with President Lincoln in Washington, traditionalist Cherokee helped maneuver the selection of Ross supporter Thomas Pegg as Acting Principal Chief. Three or four of Ross's own sons fought for the Union. However, Ross's nephew by marriage, John Drew, had organized and served as Colonel of the 1st Cherokee Mounted Rifles in the Confederate Army. Most of Drew's regiment would later twice desert rather than follow Confederate orders to kill other Indians. Many leaders of the northern faction, still led by Ross, went to Fort Leavenworth, Kansas, for the duration of the war.

By 1863, the flight of many Cherokee voters to refuge in Kansas and Texas provided the pro-Confederate Treaty Party an opportunity to elect Stand Watie as principal chief without them. Pro-Union National Council members declared the election invalid. Watie that fall raided Ross's home, Rose Cottage. The home was looted and burned. Ross lost all his belongings. Ross's daughter Jane and her husband, Andrew Nave, were living at Rose Cottage at the time. Nave was shot and killed. Only the prior intervention of Watie's wife seems to have prevented the killing of additional Ross relatives. Ross's oldest son, James, who had gone to Park Hill searching for supplies, was captured and sent to prison in the Confederacy, where he died. Ross remained in exile. However, within a week of the burning, the National Council convened and restored Ross as principal chief.

Ross took his wife Mary and the children to Philadelphia so she could see her family. Ross returned to Washington, where he had an inconclusive meeting with President Lincoln and other supporters. When he returned for Mary in 1865, he found her gravely ill with what was diagnosed as "lung congestion" (likely tuberculosis). She could not travel, so he remained with her for more than a month. Mary died of her illness on July 20, 1865. She was buried in her native Delaware. Ross returned to Indian Territory after her funeral.

After the war, the two factions of the Cherokee tried to negotiate separately with the US government Southern Treaty Commission. The commissioner of Indian Affairs, Dennis N. Cooley, was persuaded to believe allegations by Stand Watie and Elias Cornelius Boudinot that Ross was a dictator who did not truly represent the Cherokee people. Even though his health was worsening, Ross left Park Hill, where he was staying with his niece, on November 9, 1865, to meet with President Andrew Johnson. Johnson instructed Cooley to reopen negotiations with the Cherokee and to meet only with the pro-Union faction, headed by John Ross. Ross died on August 1, 1866, in Washington, D.C., while still negotiating a final treaty with the federal government. However, Ross had by then persuaded Johnson to reject a particularly harsh treaty version favored by Cooley.

== Death and legacy ==
Initially, Ross was buried beside his second wife Mary in Wilmington and Brandywine Cemetery in Wilmington, Delaware. A few months later, the Cherokee Nation returned his remains to the Ross Cemetery at Park Hill, Indian Territory (now Cherokee County, Oklahoma) for interment.

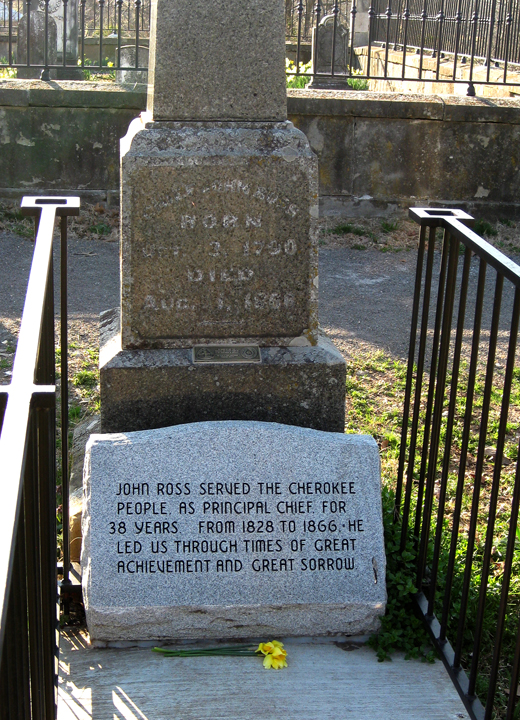
John Ross's grave in Park Hill, Oklahoma

John Ross's great-great granddaughter, Mary G. Ross (August 9, 1908 – April 29, 2008) was the first Native American female engineer. She helped propel the world into an era of space travel while becoming of one of the nation's most prominent women scientists of the space age.

John Ross's descendant, atmospheric scientist Robbie Hood, led the Uncrewed Aircraft Systems (UAS) division of the National Oceanic and Atmospheric Administration until retiring in 2017.

Several Cherokee Freedmen who were owned by Ross kept his last name. One of his former slaves, Stick Ross, later served in the Cherokee Legislature from 1893 to 1894.

=== Namesake and monuments ===
The City of Chattanooga named the Market Street Bridge in Ross's honor, and a bust of Ross stands on the north side of the Hamilton County Courthouse lawn.

The city of Rossville, Georgia, located just south of the Tennessee state line, is named for Ross. It contains his former home, the John Ross House, where he lived from 1830 to 1838 until the state seized his lands near the Coosa River. One of the oldest surviving homes in the Chattanooga area, it has been designated as a National Historic Landmark.

The city of Park Hill, Oklahoma, hosts a John Ross museum in a former schoolhouse located west of Ross Cemetery.

National Public Radio correspondent Steve Inskeep suggested that the US $20 bill be modified to carry images of both John Ross and Andrew Jackson, "illustrating our democratic experience."

=== Stage and screen ===
- John Ross was portrayed by Johnny Cash in an episode of NET Playhouse titled "Trail of Tears" in 1971.
- John Ross's life and the Trail of Tears are dramatized in Episode 3 of the Ric Burns "American Experience" documentary, We Shall Remain (2009), shown and available online on PBS.
- John Ross is a character in Unto These Hills, an outdoor drama that has been performed in Cherokee, NC since 1950.

== See also ==
- Timeline of Cherokee removal
- Indian Removal Act
- List of treaties of the Confederate States of America

== Notes ==
Preceded by William Hicks	Principal Chief of the Cherokee Nation–East; 1828–1839	Succeeded by Title ceased to exist

Preceded by Title re-instated	Principal Chief of the Cherokee Nation; 1839–1866	Succeeded by William P. Ross
