= Ross's Landing =

- U.S. National Register of Historic Places
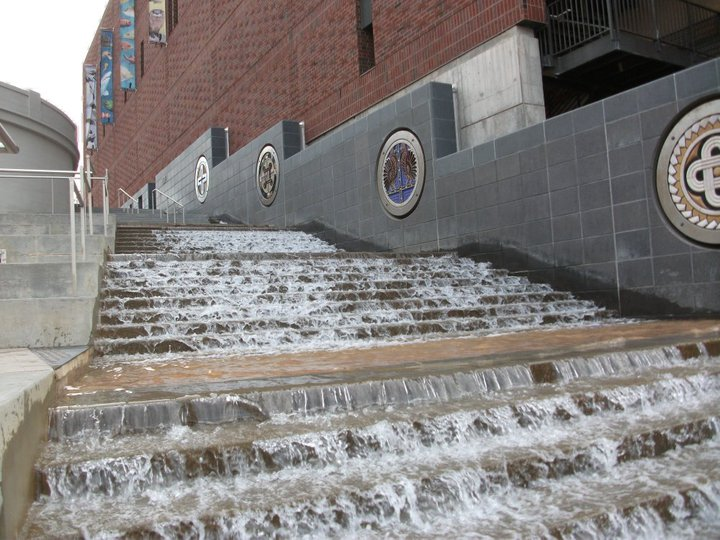
- Water cascading down steps above Ross's Landing Riverfront Park

- Location within Tennessee Location within the United States
- Location: Riverfront Pkwy. west of Market St., Chattanooga, Tennessee
- Coordinates: 35°3′23″N 85°18′32″W
- Area: 3 acres (1.2 ha)
- NRHP reference No.: 74001914
- Added to NRHP: June 27, 1974

Ross's Landing in Chattanooga, Tennessee, is the last site of the Cherokee's 61-year occupation of Chattanooga and is considered to be the embarkation point of the Cherokee removal on the Trail of Tears. Ross's Landing Riverfront Park memorializes the location, which is listed on the National Register of Historic Places.

== History ==
The landing was named for John Ross, later principal chief of the Cherokee Nation. In 1816 Ross settled at the site along the Tennessee River above Chattanooga Creek. There he established a trading post on the northern border of the Cherokee Nation, across the river from the United States of America. This area became known as "Ross's Warehouse," and "Ross's Ferry" (and alternatively, "Ross's Landing"). It was known to those passing through the area to have the best conditions for a river flatboat crossing. Ross operated a swing ferry across the river that was anchored on McClellan Island.

In 1826 Ross sold his land to a Methodist minister, Nicholas Dalton Scales, in order to move to Georgia to be closer to the political center of the Cherokee Nation.

When the United States government took over the Cherokee owned lands in 1837, the removal to Indian Territory began—known as the "Trail of Tears"—during which the Cherokee in several southeastern states were driven from their homes. Groups of the natives were staged at various camps, including east of Ross's Landing, for their coming expulsion west. On June 6, 1838, over 1500 Cherokee departed from Ross's Landing in steamboats and barges. A final group of Cherokee left in the Fall of 1838, forced to walk due to the falling levels of water in the river caused by a drought. The westward march of the Cherokee claimed several hundred lives, including Ross's wife, Quatie.

The name Ross's Landing was changed to Chattanooga by American settlers who took over the land after the Removal.

== Current landmark ==
Ross's Landing is memorialized at Ross's Landing Riverfront Park on the banks of the Tennessee River where the city of Chattanooga was established. That site was listed on the National Register of Historic Places in 1974.

In the spring of 2005, a $61 million project to improve the Tennessee public parks was started, which included the redevelopment of Ross's Landing Park. A pedestrian path connects Ross's Landing Riverfront Park to the Tennessee Aquarium. A wall along the walkway contains an art installation that symbolizes the path that Cherokee followed on their forced relocation to Oklahoma. Created by Gadugi, a group of five Cherokee artists from Oklahoma, the installation features seven large carved and glazed clay medallions set into the walkway wall. The medallions represent different aspects of Cherokee history, religious beliefs, and struggles with white settlers.
