= Mary Golda Ross =

First Native American female engineer

- Portrait photo of Ross
- Born: August 9, 1908; Park Hill, Oklahoma, United States
- Died: April 29, 2008 (aged 99); Los Altos, California, United States
- Resting place: Ross Cemetery, Park Hill, Oklahoma, United States; 35.851221°N 94.947831°W
- Citizenship: American, Cherokee
- Education: Northeastern State Teachers' College, bachelor's degree in mathematics, 1928 Colorado State Teachers College in Greeley, master's degree in mathematics, 1938 University of California, Los Angeles, professional certificate in engineering, 1949
- Known for: First Native American female engineer
- Notable work: Lockheed P-38 Lightning Skunk Works Project Polaris Project Agena Rocket Project Poseidon Missile Project Trident Missile Project NASA Planetary Flight Handbook Vol. 3
- Relatives: Great-grandfather: John Ross
- Engineering career
- Employers: Lockheed Corporation, 1942; joined their Advanced Development Program (Skunk Works), 1952.
- Significant design: "Preliminary design concepts for interplanetary space travel, crewed and uncrewed earth-orbiting flights, the earliest studies of orbiting satellites for both defense and civilian purposes."
- Awards: Silicon Valley Engineering Council’s Hall of Fame, 1992, Fellow and life member of the Society of Women Engineers, and others

Mary Golda Ross (August 9, 1908 – April 29, 2008) was a Cherokee and American aerospace engineer. She worked at the Lockheed Corporation from 1942 until her retirement in 1973, where she was best remembered for her work on aerospace design. She was one of the 40 founding engineers of the renowned and highly secretive Skunk Works project while at Lockheed Corporation.

Throughout her life, Ross was dedicated to the advancement of young women and Native Americans in STEM fields. Ten years after her death, in 2018, Ross was chosen to be depicted on the 2019 Native American $1 Coin by the U.S. Mint celebrating Native Americans in the space program.

== Early life and education ==
Mary G. Ross was born in the small town of Park Hill, Oklahoma, the second of five children of William Wallace Ross Jr and Mary Henrietta Moore Ross. She was the great-granddaughter of the Cherokee Chief John Ross. John Ross was influential in the creation of the new settlement in Oklahoma following the removal of Native Americans from their land under Andrew Jackson. This settlement for the Cherokee Nation was complete with a school and government.

A talented child, she was sent to live with her grandparents in the Cherokee Nation capital of Tahlequah, Oklahoma, to attend primary and secondary school. When she was 16, Ross enrolled in Northeastern State Teachers' College in Tahlequah. She earned a bachelor's degree in mathematics in 1928, at age 20. In 1938, Ross received her master's degree in mathematics from Colorado State Teachers College, now known as the University of Northern Colorado, in Greeley. While obtaining her Master's, Ross still took as many astronomy classes as were offered to satisfy her intense fascination with space.

In 1949, after World War II, Lockheed sent Mary G. Ross to the University of California, Los Angeles to study further. While at UCLA, she was able to obtain a professional certification in engineering. Ross was the first Native American woman to obtain this certification.

== Career ==
Ross began her career teaching math and science in rural Oklahoma schools for nine years, mostly during the Great Depression.

In 1936, Ross took the civil service examination to work for the Bureau of Indian Affairs (BIA) in Washington, D.C., as a statistical clerk. In 1937, she was reassigned as an advisor to girls at the Santa Fe Indian School, an American Indian boarding school in Santa Fe, New Mexico. While she was working at the boarding school, Ross was working towards completing her Master's in mathematics. A few years after obtaining her master's degree, Ross relocated to California in 1941 to seek work after the US joined World War II.

In 1942, Ross was hired as a mathematician by Lockheed. Her primary role, at the beginning of her career at Lockheed, was working on developing fighter planes. One of her assignments during this time was analyzing the effects of pressure on the Lockheed P-38 Lightning. The P-38 was one of the fastest airplanes designed at the time: it was the first military airplane to fly faster than 400 mph (640 km/h) in level flight. Throughout her career, Ross helped to solve numerous design issues involved with high speed flight and issues of aeroelasticity for fighter jets. Ross was able to perform intricate calculations to advance the field of aerospace design using only a pencil, slide rule, and Friden computer.

Following WWII, when men returned from war and displaced women from the jobs they held during the war, Lockheed decided to keep Ross on their team. They even sent Ross to UCLA for a professional certification in engineering, which she obtained in 1949.

In 1952, Ross helped found Lockheed's Advanced Development Program, known as Skunk Works. She was one of only forty people who worked on this project and was the only female on the team. The work done by Ross and her team for the Skunk Works project was highly confidential, and even now, most of the specifics are still classified. However, it is known that Ross's work on the Skunk Works project involved "preliminary design concepts for interplanetary space travel, crewed and uncrewed earth-orbiting flights, the earliest studies of orbiting satellites for both defense and civilian purposes."

As the nation’s focus shifted towards the Cold War and new weapon technology in the form of missiles, Lockheed recognized this shift and created the Lockheed Missiles and Space branch. Ross played an important role in research and performance evaluation of ballistic missiles and other new defense technologies for this new branch. It was also during this time that Ross made important discoveries for advancing technology related to submarine launched spacecraft and defense systems that would apply to the Polaris project.

Another major contribution Ross made while at Lockheed was for the Agena rocket project. The Agena rocket was a big part of the Gemini mission, which was a crewed space exploration aimed towards testing equipment and various procedures while in Earth's orbit. The Agena was used as a rendezvous and docking spot for the Gemini team. This project came to fruition in 1966 when it was launched into space and had a successful mission. This project was the beginning of the United States' involvement in the space age. Ross's main role in this project was in developing the specific criteria for the rocket itself using her extensive research in hydrodynamics. This aided in her advancement to establishing preliminary design concepts for flyby missions to Venus and Mars.

By the late 1960s, Ross was promoted to the senior advanced systems staff engineer position. This led to Ross joining the team working on the Poseidon and Trident missiles. Ross contributed to the NASA Planetary Flight Handbook Vol. 3.

== Later life ==
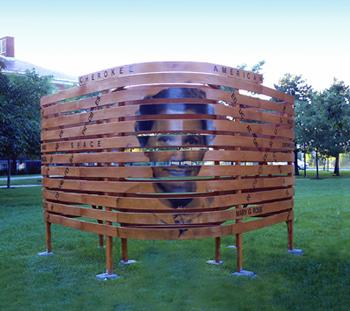
"Mary G. Ross: Scientist, Engineer, Cherokee-American" in honor of Mary G. Ross, created by Lawrence Kinney, Buffalo State College.

After retiring in 1973, Ross lived in Los Altos, California and worked to recruit young women and Native American youth into engineering careers. Since the 1950s, she had been a founding member of the Society of Women Engineers. This society focuses on aiding in the development of other young women in their pursuit of a career in engineering by providing mentoring, scholarship, and community to young women.

She also supported the American Indians in Science and Engineering Society (AISES) and the Council of Energy Resource Tribes by expanding their educational programs.

At age 96, wearing her "first traditional Cherokee dress" of green calico made by her niece, Ross participated in the opening ceremonies of the National Museum of the American Indian in Washington, D.C. Upon her death in 2008, she left a $400,000 endowment to the museum. This endowment was left to continue her legacy of support and celebration for Native Americans.

== Awards, recognitions, and important contributions ==
- Silicon Valley Engineering Council’s Hall of Fame, 1992
- Author of the NASA Planetary Flight Handbook Vol. III
- Peninsula Woman of the Year, by the women's communications society Theta Sigma Phi
- Achievement awards from the American Indian Science and Engineering Society and from the Council of Energy Resource Tribes
- The San Francisco Examiner's Award for Woman of Distinction, 1961
- Woman of Achievement Award, California State Federation of Business and Professional Clubs, 1961
- Fellow and life member of the Society of Women Engineers.
- In 1992, The Santa Clara Valley Section established a scholarship in her name.
- Google Doodle on August 9, 2018
- Ross is pictured on the reverse of the 2019 Sacagawea Dollar.

== See also ==
- Timeline of women in science
