= William Hicks (Cherokee chief) =

Principal Chief of the Cherokee Nation

William Abraham Hicks

Cherokee Nation Principal Chief (Interim)
- In office October 1827 – October 1828
- Preceded by: Charles R. Hicks
- Succeeded by: John Ross

Personal details
- Born: c. 1769
- Died: 1837 (aged 67–68) Oothkalooga Valley, Georgia
- Spouse(s): Lydia Halfbreed (Qua-La-Yu-Ga); Sarah "Sallie" Bathia Foreman
- Relations: Charles Hicks, brother;
- Children: 11
- Parent(s): Nathan Hicks & unk.

William Abraham Hicks (c. 1769 – c. 1837) was a wealthy farmer and leader of the Cherokee Nation. In a time of crisis, the National Cherokee Council named Hicks the interim Principal Chief in October 1827. He served in that capacity until October 1828. Hicks succeeded his older brother Charles Hicks, who died in office in January 1827, two weeks after coming to the position.

Hicks became a farmer in the Oothkalooga valley of present-day Georgia. He was of mixed race and supported European-American education for his and other Cherokee children, as well as the opening of a mission and school in the valley. He was baptized into the Moravian Christian faith in 1819.

== Early life and family ==
Charles and William's father was Nathan Hicks (1740–1829), a trader. (Note: Nathan Hicks is possibly the son of Robert Hicks and Mary Courtney of Virginia.) Their mother is unknown. (Note: Charles and William's mother may have been Nancy Conrad (1740–1770), a daughter of an immigrant Johann Conrad (1720–1754) and a Cherokee woman (possibly called "Jennie"). As the Cherokee had a matrilineal system, the children belonged to their mother's clan, where they gained their social status. The boys were guided to maturity by the males in their mother's family.) William was the youngest of the family. His siblings included Sarah Gosaduisga (1758), Elizabeth (1759), Mary (1760), Nathan Jr (1764), Elizabeth (1766), and Charles (1767).

== Career and community ==
William Hicks developed a farm in the valley of the Oothkalooga Creek, along with Cherokee leader and neighbor, Major Ridge, and turned it into a recognized "garden spot" (near present-day Calhoun in Gordon County, Georgia).

During these years Hicks became allied with Major Ridge. They shared some ambitions for their children and the Cherokee people. They both sent sons to study with the Moravian missionaries, the Gambolds. In addition, Hicks became baptized as a Christian, as did his wife. About 1822 Ridge and Hicks urged Father Gambold to open a mission at Oothkalooga (Ustinali) and establish a missionary school, as they had more children to be educated.

=== Leadership role ===
William's older brother, Charles, was the assistant to Principal Chief Pathkiller, who held that title from 1811 to 1827, but was in fact, after 1813, the head of the people in name only. Charles acted as chief in Pathkiller's name. He officially became Second Principal Chief of the Cherokee in 1823 or 24; so after the death of Pathkiller, Charles Hicks succeeded him to the office. Barely two weeks into the position, however, Charles died (January 20, 1827). At this time, Major Ridge was Speaker of the Council; he assumed leadership of the lower house. John Ross continued as President of the National Committee, or upper house.

With a policy of increasing centralization of tribal leadership ongoing for almost a decade, in 1827 the Cherokee changed their government to a constitutional republic that incorporated many aspects of Cherokee tradition. Perhaps because the adoption of a new constitution had provoked an outcry from representatives of bordering states, the tribe was under tremendous pressure to make additional land cessions to Georgia and North Carolina. The Council chose to put in place an interim government in order to better deal with the situation. At its meeting in October 1827 at New Echota, it named William Hicks as principal chief, Ross as second chief, and Elijah Hicks as President of the National Committee. William Hicks served until October 1828 during a time of great tension.

=== Events while in office ===
In December 1827, Georgia made an appeal to President John Quincy Adams, and claimed that Cherokee territory was under its jurisdiction. The Council addressed this when U.S. federal treaty commissioners requested a meeting with the body at Hiwassee. The Council declined, saying those meetings were only about ceding land to the United States, and the Cherokee had no more land to give.

=== Relieved of duty ===
John Ross became Principal Chief in October 1828. He was of European and Cherokee ancestry, and had been educated in American schools, was bilingual, and was among the mixed-race elite leaders of the tribe, who were more acculturated to European-American ways. Most of the rest of the tribe did not speak English. George Lowery was elected Second Principal Chief, Lewis Ross as President of the National Committee, Going Snake as Speaker of the Council, John Martin as Chief Justice of the Supreme Court. Hicks and Ridge were made counselors to the chiefs.

== Later life ==
Hicks was disappointed that Ross was chosen as Principal Chief over him. He had become eccentric in the eyes of the tribal members. Ross took him with a delegation to Washington, however, to discuss land issues, but afterward Hicks' actions became increasingly erratic.

== Marriage and family ==
Hicks married Lydia Qua-La-Yu-Ga Halfbreed, born about 1769 in Spring Place, Georgia. Their son, Chief George Augustus Hicks, was a conductor on the Trail of Tears that went through Ft. Smith Arkansas. (Note: Lydia also married Leonard Shaw and had several children by him.)

In 1804, he married his second wife, Sarah "Sallie" Bathia Foreman, born about 1788 in Cherokee territory in present-day Tennessee (Note: Sallie was the daughter of John Foreman and Susie Ti-Ta-S-Gi-S-Gi Rattling Gourd 1760-1830 (daughter of John Gourd and Teetarskeekee 1741-1828).) She died September 1, 1839, in Fairfield, Cherokee Nation, Indian Territory, on the Trail of Tears.

== Death ==
Hicks died at age 68 at Oothkalooga Creek before The Removal.

== See also ==
- Andrew Jackson

== Sources ==
- Hicks, Charles R., Memoirs of Charles Renatus (United Bretherin (Moravian) Archives, Winston-Salem, NC).
- John Howard Payne Collection (Daniel Butrick Papers), Newberry Library, Chicago, Illinois.
- McLoughlin, William G. Cherokee Renascence in the New Republic. (Princeton: Princeton University Press, 1992).
- Wilkins, Thurman. Cherokee Tragedy: The Ridge Family and the Decimation of a People, New York: Macmillan Company, 1970; reprint 1989.

Preceded by Charles R. Hicks	Principal Chief of the Cherokee Nation–East; 1827–1828	Succeeded by John Ross
