= Hair Conrad Cabin =

Historic house in Tennessee, United States

- U.S. National Register of Historic Places
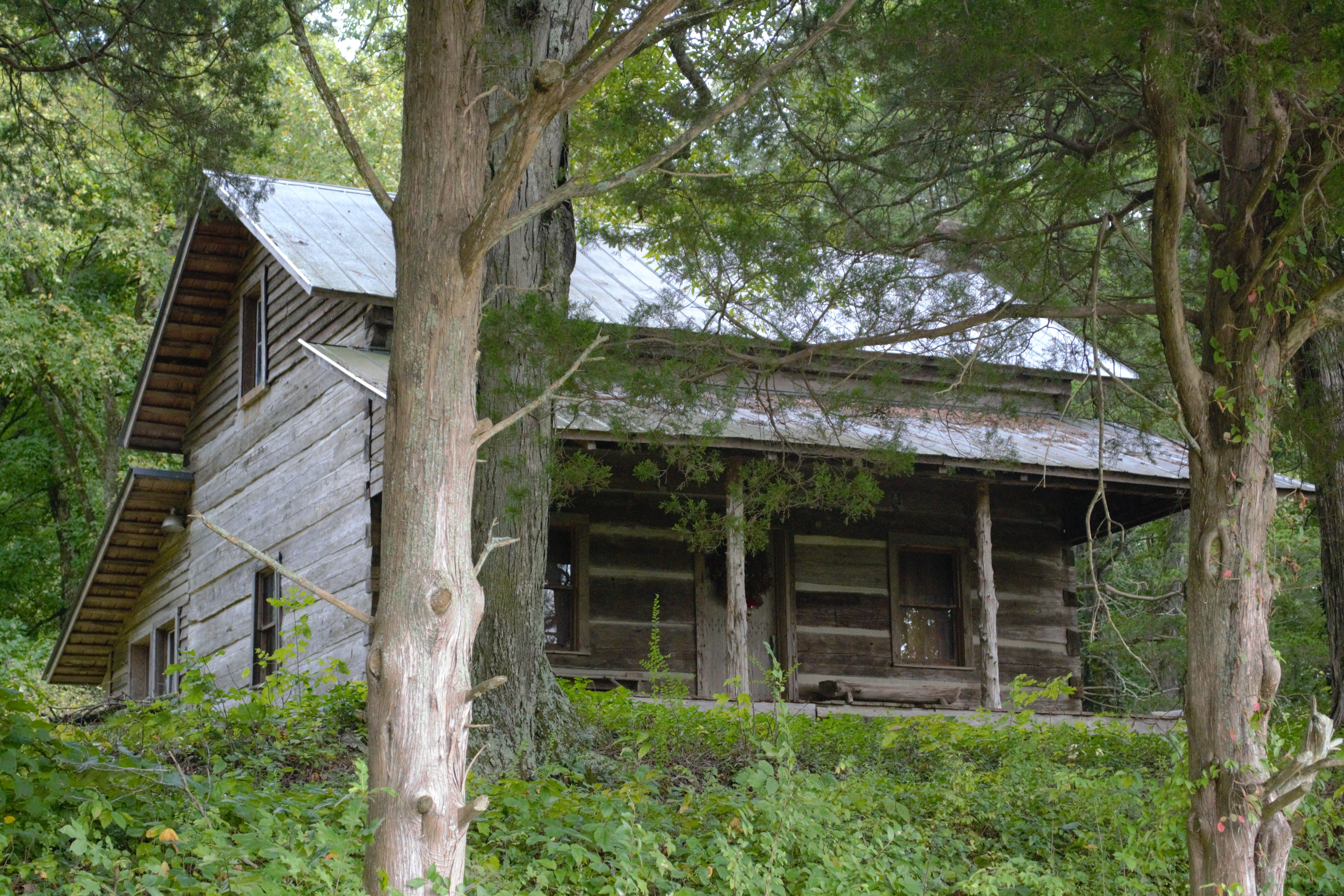

- Location within Tennessee Location within the United States
- Nearest city: Cleveland, Tennessee
- Coordinates: 35°9′47″N 84°54′37″W
- Area: 4 acres (1.6 ha)
- Built: 1804
- NRHP reference No.: 76001765
- Added to NRHP: September 13, 1976

The Hair Conrad Cabin is a historic log cabin in Bradley County, Tennessee, United States, and the oldest residential structure in the county.

It is a single-pen cabin that was built in the early 1800s by a Cherokee known by the names Tekahskeh and Hair Conrad. Its construction followed the style of cabins built by white settlers of the era.

Hair Conrad, who had a white father and a Cherokee mother, farmed the land near the cabin, growing apples, peaches, and other produce. A leader in the Cherokee community and a "man of means", he was the founder of a school for the education of Cherokee children. He participated in writing the Cherokee Constitution in 1827, and prior to 1836 he was a representative of the Cherokee Nation in Washington, D.C. He was later (in 1838) to lead the first detachment of Cherokees from Rattlesnake Springs on the Trail of Tears and died soon after reaching Oklahoma in 1839.

After Hair Conrad's departure, a succession of white families owned and lived in the cabin. It is now on the property of Blythewood Farms.

The cabin was listed on the National Register of Historic Places in 1976.

== See also ==
- Charles R. Hicks
