= Robbie Hood =

American atmospheric scientist

Robbie Hood is an atmospheric scientist who studies hurricanes. She was lead scientist for the Convection and Moisture Experiment at NASA and Director of the Unmanned Aircraft Systems (UAS) division of the National Oceanic and Atmospheric Administration.

== Early life and education ==
Hood grew up in Neosho, Missouri and Picayune, Mississippi, where in 1969 she witnessed the devastation of Hurricane Camille and in 1974 the Neosho tornado, sparking a lifelong interest in storms. She earned a BS degree in atmospheric science from the University of Missouri at Columbia and an MS degree in physical meteorology from Florida State University.

== Research ==
Hood joined the Marshall Space Flight Center (MSFC) in 1986, ultimately leading a team of scientists and engineers to develop passive microwave instrumentation sensors deployed on aircraft to observe precipitation and oceanic winds for the NASA Convection And Moisture Experiment. The team studied events in or near Australia, Brazil, Alaska, the Marshall Islands, Costa Rica and the coastal regions of the United States. Her team also collaborated with lightning researchers at MSFC to simultaneously observe electric field information from the aircraft. Hood was a mission scientist in three NASA research experiments studying hurricane genesis, intensity, precipitation, and landfalling impacts. In 1999, she was the NASA Lead DC-8 Aircraft Scientist for the KWAJalein EXperiment and the NASA ER-2 Aircraft Scientist for the Tropical Rainfall Measuring Mission - Large scale Biosphere- Atmosphere mission. She published over 50 papers over the course of her career.

!n September 2008, Hood became the first permanent director of NOAA's Unmanned Aircraft Systems Program. She led the Sensing Hazards with Operational Unmanned Technology (SHOUT) program, using high-altitude drones to measure wind speed and other attributes within storms.

== Native American heritage ==
Hood is a direct descendant of John Ross, the first elected chief of the Cherokee Nation, who served for nearly 40 years and led the Cherokees on the Trail of Tears. She has credited her Native American heritage for her appreciation of the beneficial contributions that diversity brings to all community sectors. She was keynote speaker for the NASA Awareness Days symposium held with the North Dakota Tribal Colleges in 2002. After retirement, she worked with the Choctaw nation in Oklahoma to develop a testing ground for unmanned aircraft systems with support from the Federal Aviation Administration.
