= Pathkiller (principal chief) =

Principal Chief of the Cherokees (1811–1827)

- Nungnoheeahdahee

Cherokee Nation Principal Chief
- In office 1811 – January 8, 1827
- Preceded by: Black Fox
- Succeeded by: Charles Hicks

Personal details
- Born: c. 1745
- Died: January 8, 1827
- Resting place: Old Indian cemetery, New Echota, Georgia
- Spouse: Peggy Carpenter
- Children: 5 sons, 8 daughters
- Parent: Oconastota
- Known for: Last full-blooded national Cherokee chief
- Mother tongue: Tsalagi

Pathkiller (Nungnoheeahdahee; c.1745 – January 8, 1827) was a Cherokee warrior who rose from the rank of pathkiller to that of the rank of Principal Chief of the Cherokee Nation. The moniker, "Pathkiller," stayed with him through the rest of his life, as that was how the people of the colonies knew him. It became the family name of his descendants.

== Family life ==
Pathkiller (Note: Pathkiller is a Cherokee rank or title—not a name. He lived for a time at Turkeytown.) was the son of Oconostota.

== Warrior life ==
At the outbreak of the American Revolutionary War, he fought against the Overmountain Men and Wataugan frontiersmen who had settled in the Washington District. Afterward, he joined with Dragging Canoe and the Chickamauga Cherokee faction fighting in the Cherokee–American wars, until the conclusion of hostilities in 1794. Primary documents show that he served at an advanced age in an honorary and "non-combatant" capacity for the "Regiment of Cherokees" commanded by Colonel Gideon Morgan under Andrew Jackson, against the Red Stick Indian uprising during the Creek War (October 7, 1813 – April 11, 1814). That war was a frontier extension of the War of 1812.

== Cherokee national leader ==
Pathkiller was the last conservative and full-blooded chief of the original Cherokee Nation. He was the principal chief of the Nation from 1811 to 1827.

A description of Cherokee Council sessions was given by the missionary, Ard Hoyt, on a visit to the seat of Cherokee government in October 1818:

On entering, I observed the King [Path Killer] seated on a rug, at one end of the room, having his back supported by a roll of blankets. He is a venerable looking man, 73 years old; his hair nearly white. At his right hand, on one end of the same rug or mat, sat brother [Charles] Hicks. The chiefs were seated in chairs, in a semicircle, each facing the king. Behind the chiefs a number of the common people were standing listening to a conversation, in which the king and chiefs were engaged.

The probable burial site of Principal Chief Pathkiller at a cemetery found in the old Cherokee Nation capital of New Echota.

After 1813, the de facto authority in the Cherokee Nation had shifted to Charles R. Hicks, who was the first chief of partial European descent. Pathkiller remained chief in title only—basically as a figurehead—until his death on January 8, 1827. Two weeks after Pathkiller's death, his successor, Charles Hicks, also died (on January 20, 1827), leaving a leadership vacuum that was filled in the interim by William Hicks, brother to Charles. Pathkiller and the Hicks were mentors to John Ross, having identified the talented young mixed-blood Cherokee of Scots-Irish descent as the future leader of the Cherokee people. After the tribe formed a constitutional republic, Ross was elected principal chief, in October 1828.

== Burial site ==
There is a monument-style table-tomb burial site for a Pathkiller—which was previously recorded in the region as a tomb of an "unknown Indian"—located in the present day Calhoun, Georgia area, at the site of the old Cherokee capital town of New Echota. (Note: There is a grave site for a local Colonel Pathkiller (who died exactly one year after on January 8, 1828) often conflated with this Principal Chief Pathkiller (died January 8, 1827). This grave is in proximity to his known residence at the time of his death, near the former Cherokee Turkeytown settlement, where he was a local white-chief and head man. He is a possible relative to Chief Pathkiller. His grave is in the woods just outside the fenced Garrett family cemetery—located at the former site of Garrett's Ferry, Alabama—alongside the Coosa River in Centre, Cherokee County, Alabama.)

== Notes ==
Preceded by Black Fox	Principal Chief of the Cherokee Nation–East; 1811–1828	Succeeded by Charles R. Hicks
