= Charles R. Hicks =

Cherokee leader

Charles Renatus Hicks (Cherokee: ᏣᎵ ᎯᎦᏌᏩ, romanized: Tsali Higasaya; December 23, 1767 – January 20, 1827) was one of the three most important leaders of the Cherokee people in the early 19th century, together with James Vann and Major Ridge. The three men all had some European ancestry, as did numerous other Cherokee, but they identified as Cherokee. The people had a matrilineal kinship system, so children were considered born into their mother's family and clan.

These three leaders were among those who urged their people to acculturate to European-American ways, in order to succeed in a rapidly changing world. An increasing number of European Americans were entering their territory.

Hicks supported a Moravian mission school in Cherokee territory in order to formally educate the tribe's children. He served as the "second" chief. In 1827 when Principal Chief Pathkiller died in office; Hicks succeeded to that position. He died two weeks later.

== Early life and education ==
Charles Renatus Hicks was born December 23, 1767, in the town of Tomotley near the Hiwassee River, at its confluence with the Tennessee River in present-day eastern Tennessee. He was the son of Nan-Ye-Hi, a half-blood Cherokee woman, and a white (probably Scots) trader named Nathan Hicks. At the time, both the Cherokee people and European traders thought that such strategic alliances benefited them. Among his younger siblings was his brother William Hicks.

As the Cherokee were a matrilineal culture, the children of Nan-Ye-Hi were considered to belong to her family and Paint Clan. Her brothers and other senior males were considered more important to the boys' upbringing than their biological father was. They grew up within the Cherokee Nation and gained status from her clan, but the boys also learned English. This gave them advantages for dealing with the European Americans and advancing politically.

Nan-Ye-Hi and her brother Gunrod were the children of a Jennie (Oconostota) Taylor, a Cherokee woman, and Jacob (aka Johann) Conrad, a Swiss immigrant. Gunrod married Onai (Cherokee), and had several children: Hair Conrad, Rattlinggourd, Terrapin Head, Young Wolf, and Quatie.

== Marriage and children ==
Charles Hicks married Nancy Anna Felicitas Broom as his principal wife. She was the daughter of Chief Broom of Broomstown, located on the northeastern border of present-day Alabama. Some Cherokee had moved there under pressure from the Creek and British. The village was later abandoned.

Nancy and Charles Hicks had several children: Elsie (1760–1826), Nathan Wolf (b.1795), Elijah 1797, Elizabeth (Betsy) 1797, Sarah Elizabeth 1798, Jesse Hicks 1801, Edward, and Leonard Looney 1804. Their son Elijah married Margaret Ross, a half-sister of Chief John Ross. Their son, Nathan, married Elsy (Alice) Shorey. (As a successful Cherokee man, Hicks later took other wives, a traditional practice among his people.)

== Career ==
Hicks was bilingual and he served as an interpreter to the U.S. Indian Agent Return Jonathan Meigs, Sr. (1740–1823). Meigs served as agent for more than two decades to the Cherokee in southeastern Tennessee/Western North Carolina, from 1801 to his death. Hicks also acted as treasurer for the Cherokee Nation, which organized in a more centralized way in 1794.

The Creek, traditional competitors and enemies of the Cherokee, became divided over acculturation and land issues, resulting in the Creek War. It spilled over into the War of 1812 between the United States and Great Britain, as some of the Creek were allied with the British. Hicks fought with United States troops and southern militia under General Andrew Jackson against the Creek Red Sticks (the conservative faction) in the 1814 Battle of Horseshoe Bend in what is now central Alabama.

Allied with other former warriors James Vann and Major Ridge, Hicks formed a triumvirate with them; they were among the most influential younger leaders in the Nation. The three men were prominent from the late eighteenth century, after the Cherokee–American wars, to just past the first quarter of the 19th century. They supported acculturation and adoption of some European-American ways.

After reading a book called Idea Fidei Fratrum, an exposition of Moravian doctrine, Hicks embraced Christianity. He was baptized on April 20, 1813, by Moravian missionaries as Charles Renatus ("Born Again") Hicks. His wife was baptized the next day. As the Moravians recognized that the Cherokee had a matrilineal society, they were glad to have converted a Cherokee mother, expecting her to influence her children.

Hicks was extremely well-read and acculturated, and had collected one of the largest personal libraries in North America at the time, public or private. In an 1826 letter to John Ross, whom he was grooming as a future Principal Chief, Charles Hicks recounted the history of the Cherokee tribe. He related events from his youth, including his encounters with the chiefs Attacullaculla and Oconostota, and early European trader Cornelius Dougherty, as well as stories of traditions.

In 1817, Hicks was elected Second Principal Chief under Pathkiller. After the "revolt of the young chiefs" two years later, partly over land deals, Hicks became the de facto head of government, with Pathkiller serving as a figurehead. When Pathkiller died in January 1827, Hicks succeeded him as Principal Chief, the first Cherokee of any European ancestry to serve in that position.

On January 20, 1827, Hicks died, two weeks after assuming office. His younger brother William Abraham Hicks served as interim Principal Chief. John Ross, as President of the National Committee, and Major Ridge, as Speaker of the National Council, had more true political power. The tribe ended its traditional government and formed a constitutional republic.

In 1828 it elected John Ross as the new Principal Chief. Popular with full-bloods, who outnumbered the mixed-race members by a three-to-one margin, Ross was repeatedly re-elected. He served as Principal Chief until his death in 1867, after the American Civil War.

== Sources ==
- Brown, John P. Old Frontiers: The Story of the Cherokee Indians from Earliest Times to the Date of Their Removal to the West, 1838 . (Kingsport, TN: Southern Publishers, 1938 / Arno Press Reprint, New York, 1971).
- Hicks, Charles R., Memoirs of Charles Renatus (United Bretherin (Moravian) Archives, Winston-Salem, NC).
- McClinton, Rowena. The Moravian Springplace Mission to the Cherokees, 1805-1821. (Lincoln, NE: University of Nebraska Press, 2007, 2 volumes).
- McClinton, Rowena Ruff. "Notable Persons in Cherokee History: Charles Hicks," Journal of Cherokee Studies 17 (1996): 16-27).
- Moulton, Gary E.(editor), The Papers of Chief John Ross,(Norman, OK, University Of Oklahoma Press, 1985), Vol. I.
- William G. McLoughlin|McLoughlin, William G., Cherokee Renascence in the New Republic. (Princeton: Princeton University Press, 1992).
- Wilkins, Thurman. Cherokee Tragedy: The Ridge Family and the Decimation of a People. (New York: Macmillan Company, 1970).

Preceded by Pathkiller	Principal Chief of the Cherokee Nation–East; 1827	Succeeded by William Hicks
