= Oothkalooga Creek =

Stream in Georgia, U.S.

Coordinates: 34.40912°N 84.9462°W

Oothkalooga Creek is a stream in the U.S. state of Georgia. It is a tributary to the Oostanaula River.

Oothkalooga is a name derived from the Cherokee language, meaning "beaver".

== See also ==
- List of rivers of Georgia (U.S. state)
