= Chattanooga Creek =

Stream in Georgia and Tennessee, U.S.

Coordinates: 35°00′00″N 85°18′18″W

Chattanooga Creek is a stream in Walker County, Georgia, and Hamilton County, Tennessee.

Chattanooga is a Muskogean-language name meaning "rock coming to a point".

At the USGS station at Flintstone, Georgia, Chattanooga Creek has a discharge of 105 cubic feet per second (3.0 m^{3}/s).

== See also ==
- List of rivers of Georgia (U.S. state)
- List of rivers of Tennessee
