= History of the Cherokee language =

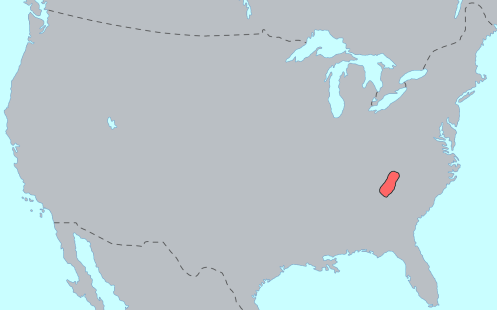
Pre-contact Distribution of the Cherokee Language

The Cherokee language is the indigenous American Iroquoian language native to the Cherokee people. In 2019, the Tri-Council of Cherokee tribes declared a state of emergency for the language due to the threat of it going extinct, calling for the enhancement of revitalization programs.

== Origin of the name ==
The Cherokee call their language Tsalagi (ᏣᎳᎩ) or Tslagi. They refer to themselves as Aniyunwiya (ᎠᏂᏴᏫᏯ), which means "Principal People". The Iroquois based in New York have historically called the Cherokee Oyata’ge’ronoñ, which means "inhabitants of the cave country".

Many theories – though none proven – abound about the origin of the name "Cherokee". It may have originally been derived from the Choctaw word Cha-la-kee, which means "those who live in the mountains", or Choctaw Chi-luk-ik-bi, meaning "those who live in the cave country". The earliest Spanish rendering of Cherokee, from 1755, is Tchalaquei. Another theory is that "Cherokee" derives from a Lower Creek word, Cvlakke ("chuh-log-gee"), meaning someone who speaks another language. In the Lower dialect of ᏣᎳᎩ, which was traditionally spoken in what is now Georgia and South Carolina, the Cherokee called their language jaragi, as the Eastern or lower dialect had a rolling "r" sound in place of the "l" sound used in the other dialects. This pronunciation may have served as a basis for the current English language name for the people.

The North American origins and eventual English language form of "Cherokee" were researched by James Mooney in the nineteenth century. In his Myths of the Cherokee (1888) he writes:

It first appears as Chalaque in the Portuguese narrative of De Soto's expedition, published originally in 1557, while we find Cheraqui in a French document of 1699, and "Cherokee" as an English form as early, at least, as 1708. The name has thus an authentic [sic] history of 360 years.

— James Mooney, "Myths of the Cherokee"

== Pre-Contact history ==
There are two prevailing views about Cherokee origins, and most of what is known about Cherokee history can be studied through their traditional language. One theory is that the Cherokee, an Iroquoian-speaking people, are relative latecomers to Southern Appalachia, who may have migrated in late prehistoric times from northern areas, the traditional territory of the later Haudenosaunee five nations and other Iroquoian-speaking peoples. Researchers in the 19th century recorded conversations with elders who recounted an oral tradition of the Cherokee people's migrating south from the Great Lakes region in ancient times. The other theory, which is disputed by academic specialists, is that the Cherokee had been in the Southeast for thousands of years. Pre-contact Cherokee are considered to be part of the later Pisgah phase of Southern Appalachia, which lasted from circa 1000 to 1500.

In 1540, The Cherokee lay claim to 40,000 square miles in the southeastern part of what later became the United States. This area included parts of what is now the states of Alabama, Georgia, North Carolina, South Carolina, Virginia, West Virginia, Kentucky and Tennessee.

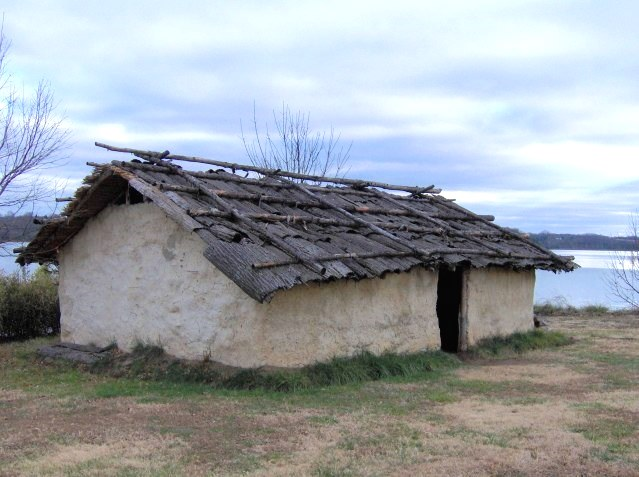
Reconstruction of a typical Tuskegee Village dwelling at Fort Loudoun State Park, near Vonore, Tennessee. The original site of Tuskegee is now under the lake in the background.

Much of what is known about pre-19th century Cherokee culture and society comes from the papers of American writer John Howard Payne. The Payne papers describe the account by Cherokee elders of a traditional societal structure in which a "white" organization of elders represented the seven clans. According to Payne, this group, which was hereditary and described as priestly, was responsible for religious activities such as healing, purification, and prayer. A second group of younger men, the "red" organization, was responsible for warfare. Warfare was considered a polluting activity, which required the purification of the priestly class before participants could reintegrate into normal village life. This hierarchy had disappeared long before the 18th century. The reasons for the change have been debated, with the origin of the decline often located with a revolt by the Cherokee against the abuses of the priestly class known as the Ani-kutani (Aní- is a prefix referring to a group of individuals, while the meaning of kutáni is unknown).

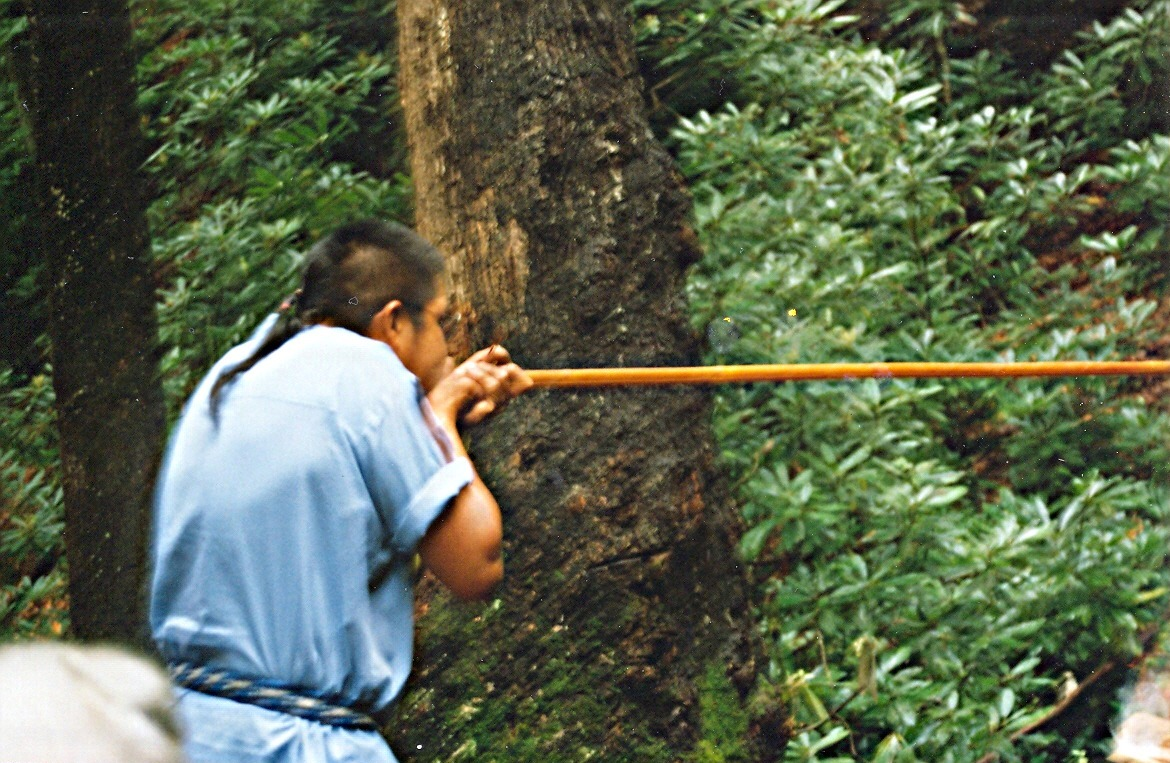
Blowgun demonstration in Oconaluftee Indian Village, Cherokee, North Carolina. Cherokee language and culture have been kept alive together. Today, churches within Cherokee tribal jurisdiction areas give services in the language, and on ceremonial "stomp" grounds ceremonial leaders are required to perform all duties in the language and all information and records are kept in the syllabary.

Ethnographer James Mooney, who studied the Cherokee in the late 1880s, first traced the decline of the former hierarchy to this revolt. By the time of Mooney, the structure of Cherokee religious practitioners was more informal, based more on individual knowledge and ability than upon heredity.

Another major source of early cultural history comes from materials written in the 19th century by the didanvwisgi (Cherokee: ᏗᏓᏅᏫᏍᎩ), Cherokee medicine men, after Sequoyah's creation of the Cherokee syllabary in the 1820s. Initially only the didanvwisgi used these materials, which were considered extremely powerful. Later, the writings were widely adopted by the Cherokee people.

Unlike most other Indians in the American southeast at the start of the historic era, the Cherokee spoke an Iroquoian language. Since the Great Lakes region was the core of Iroquoian language speakers, scholars have theorized that the Cherokee migrated south from that region. However, some argue that the Iroquois migrated north from the southeast, with the Tuscarora breaking off from that group during the migration. Linguistic analysis shows a relatively large difference between Cherokee and the northern Iroquoian languages, suggesting a split in the distant past. Glottochronology studies suggest the split occurred between about 1,500 and 1,800 B.C. The ancient settlement of Kituwa on the Tuckasegee River, formerly next to and now part of Qualla Boundary (the reservation of the Eastern Band of Cherokee Indians), is often cited as the original Cherokee settlement in the Southeast.

== 17th century: English contact ==
In 1657, there was a disturbance in Virginia Colony as the Rechahecrians or Rickahockans, as well as the Siouan Manahoac and Nahyssan, broke through the frontier and settled near the Falls of the James, near present-day Richmond, Virginia. The following year, a combined force of English and Pamunkey drove the newcomers away. The identity of the Rechahecrians has been much debated. Historians noted the name closely resembled that recorded for the Eriechronon or Erielhonan, commonly known as the Erie tribe. The Iroquoian people had been driven away from the southern shore of Lake Erie by the powerful Iroquois Five Nations in 1654. The anthropologist Martin Smith theorized some remnants of the tribe migrated to Virginia after the wars (1986:131–32). Few historians suggest this tribe was Cherokee.

Virginian traders developed a small-scale trading system with the Cherokee before the end of the 17th century; the earliest recorded Virginia trader to live among the Cherokee was Cornelius Dougherty or Dority, in 1690. The Cherokee sold the traders Indian slaves for use as laborers in Virginia and further north.

== 18th century ==
Over the course of the 18th century, the number of Cherokee speakers declined sharply. In the 1730s the population halved due to commercial trade with England that resulted in the spread of diseases such as smallpox to which the indigenous peoples had no immunity. In the 1780s the Cherokee people faced genocidal wars with British settlers, significantly the Anglo-Cherokee War, and conflicts with other tribes including the Muscogee.

== 19th century ==
=== Literacy ===
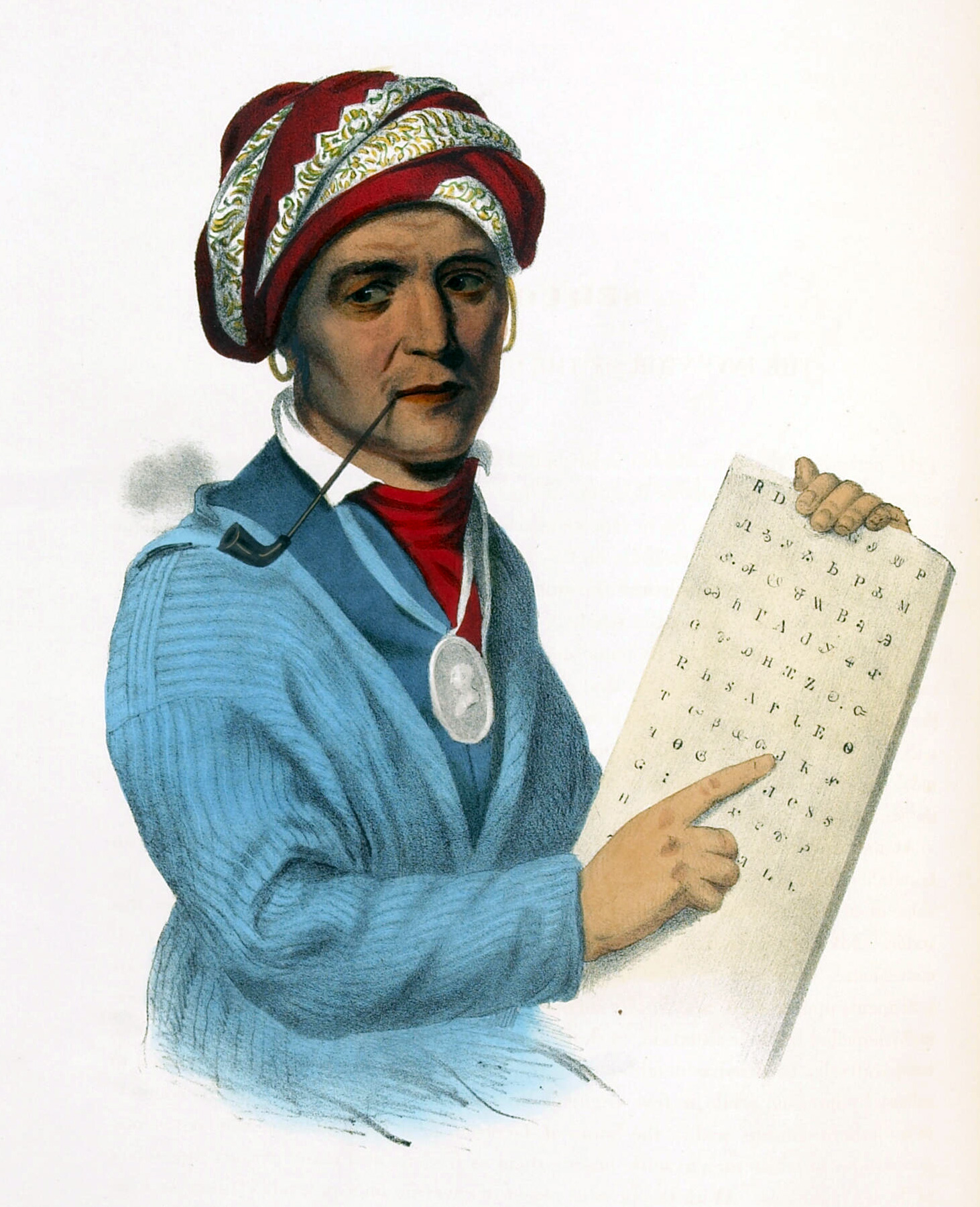
Sequoyah, inventor of the Cherokee syllabary

Before the development of the Cherokee syllabary in the 1820s, Cherokee was a spoken language only. The Cherokee syllabary is a syllabary invented by Sequoyah in the late 1810s and early 1820s to write the Cherokee language. His creation of the syllabary is particularly noteworthy in that he could not previously read any script. He first experimented with logograms, but his system later developed into a syllabary. In his system, each symbol represents a syllable rather than a single phoneme; the 85 (originally 86) characters in the Cherokee syllabary provide a suitable method to write Cherokee. Some symbols do resemble the Latin, Greek and even the Cyrillic scripts' letters, but the sounds are completely different (for example, the sound /a/ is written with a letter that resembles Latin D).

Around 1809, Sequoyah began work to create a system of writing for the Cherokee language. At first he sought to create a character for each word in the language. He spent a year on this effort, leaving his fields unplanted, so that his friends and neighbors thought he had lost his mind. His wife is said to have burned his initial work, believing it to be witchcraft. He finally realized that this approach was impractical because it would require too many pictures to be remembered. He then tried making a symbol for every idea, but this also caused too many problems to be practical.

Sequoyah did not succeed until he gave up trying to represent entire words and developed a symbol for each syllable in the language. After approximately a month, he had a system of 86 characters, some of which were Latin letters he obtained from a spelling book. "In their present form, many of the syllabary characters resemble Roman, Cyrillic or Greek letters or Arabic numerals," says Janine Scancarelli, a scholar of Cherokee writing, "but there is no apparent relationship between their sounds in other languages and in Cherokee."

Unable to find adults willing to learn the syllabary, he taught it to his daughter, Ayokeh (also spelled Ayoka). Langguth says she was only six years old at the time. He traveled to the Indian Reserves in the Arkansaw Territory where some Cherokee had settled. When he tried to convince the local leaders of the syllabary's usefulness, they doubted him, believing that the symbols were merely ad hoc reminders. Sequoyah asked each to say a word, which he wrote down, and then called his daughter in to read the words back. This demonstration convinced the leaders to let him teach the syllabary to a few more people. This took several months, during which it was rumored that he might be using the students for sorcery. After completing the lessons, Sequoyah wrote a dictated letter to each student, and read a dictated response. This test convinced the western Cherokee that he had created a practical writing system.

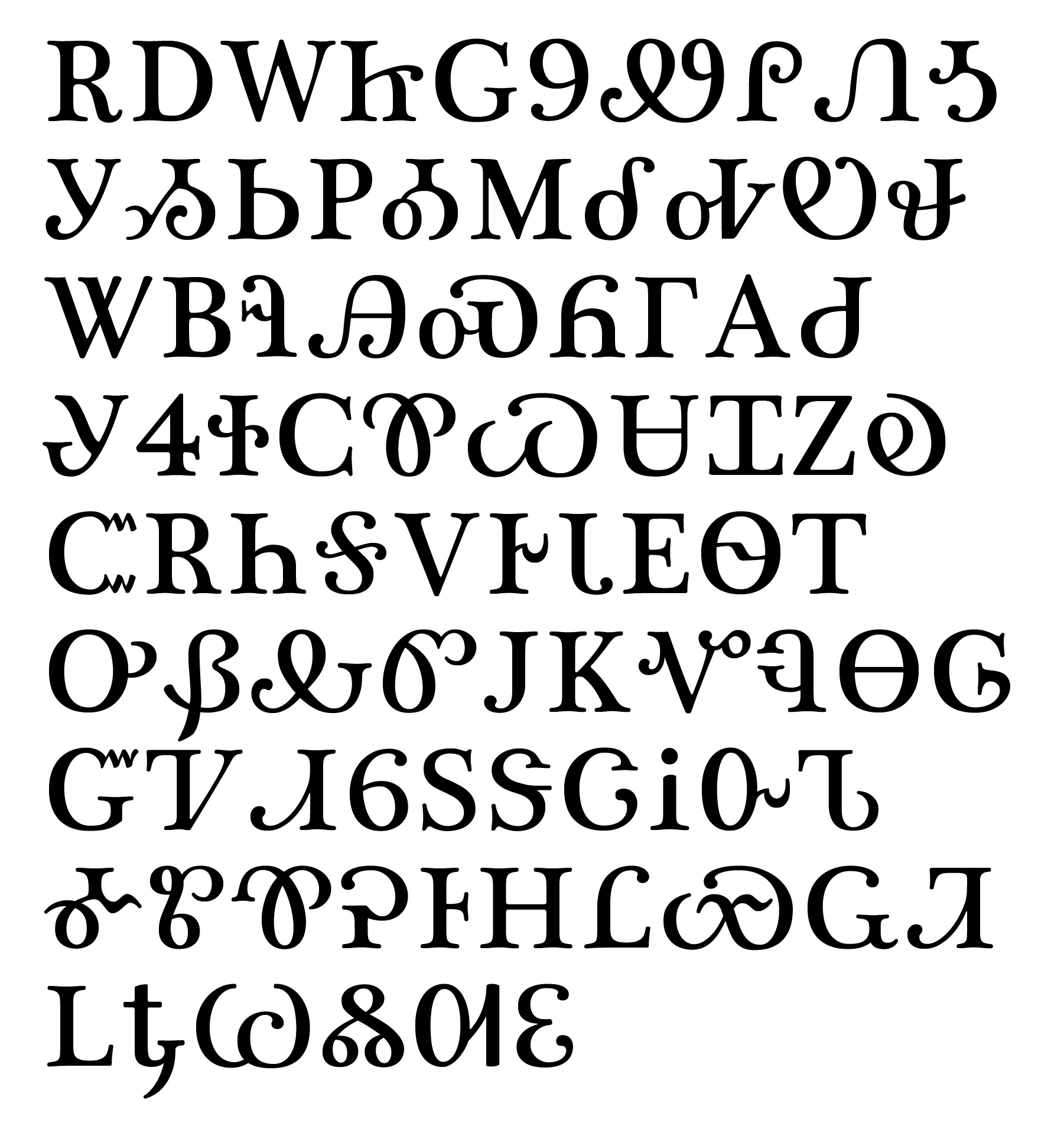
Sequoyah's syllabary in the order that he originally arranged the characters.

When Sequoyah returned east, he brought a sealed envelope containing a written speech from one of the Arkansas Cherokee leaders. By reading this speech, he convinced the eastern Cherokee also to learn the system, after which it spread rapidly. In 1825 the Cherokee Nation officially adopted the writing system. From 1828 to 1834, American missionaries assisted the Cherokee in using Sequoyah's syllabary to develop type characters and print the Cherokee Phoenix, the first newspaper of the Cherokee Nation, with text in both Cherokee and English.

In 1826, the Cherokee National Council commissioned George Lowrey and his son-in-law David Brown to translate and print eight copies of the laws of the Cherokee Nation in the new Cherokee language using Sequoyah's system.

Once Albert Gallatin saw a copy of Sequoyah's syllabary, he found the syllabary superior to the English alphabet. Even though the Cherokee student must learn 85 characters instead of 26, he can read immediately. The student could accomplish in a few weeks what students of English writing could learn in two years.

In 1824, the General Council of the Eastern Cherokee awarded Sequoyah a large silver medal in honor of the syllabary. According to Davis, one side of the medal bore his image surrounded by the inscription in English, "Presented to George Gist by the General Council of the Cherokee for his ingenuity in the invention of the Cherokee Alphabet." The reverse side showed two long-stemmed pipes and the same inscription written in Cherokee. Supposedly, Sequoyah wore the medal throughout the rest of his life and it was buried with him.

By 1825, the Bible and numerous religious hymns and pamphlets, educational materials, legal documents and books were translated into the Cherokee language. Thousands of Cherokee became literate and the literacy rate for Cherokee in the syllabary was higher than that of whites in the English alphabet.

Though use of the Cherokee syllabary declined after many of the Cherokee were relocated to Indian Territory, present day Oklahoma, it has survived in private correspondence, renderings of the Bible, and descriptions of Indian medicine and now can be found in books and on the internet among other places.

==== Cherokee Phoenix ====
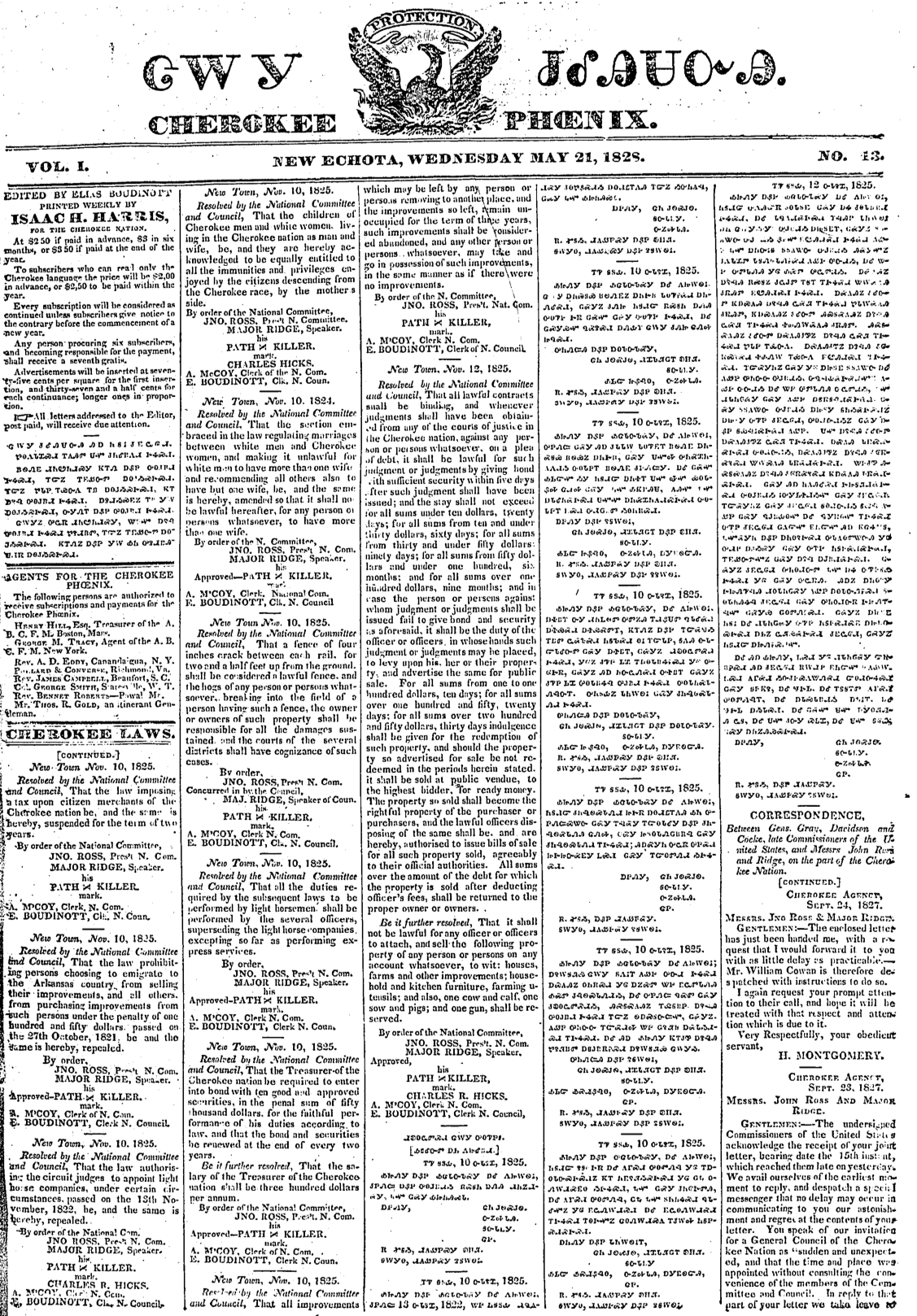
Cherokee Phoenix Newspaper front page on May 21, 1828 (ᏣᎳᎩ ᏧᎴᎯᏌᏅᎯ)

In 1827, the Cherokee National Council appropriated funds to print a newspaper.

... Early the following year, the hand press and syllabary characters in type were shipped by water from Boston and transported overland the last two hundred miles by wagon to the capital of the Cherokee Nation, New Echota. The inaugural issue of the newspaper, "Tsa la gi Tsu lehisanunhi" or "Cherokee Phoenix", printed in parallel columns in Cherokee and English appeared on February 21, 1828.

— Wilma Mankiller and Michael Wallis, "Mankiller",

The Cherokee Phoenix (ᏣᎳᎩ ᏧᎴᎯᏌᏅᎯ, Tsalagi Tsulehisanvhi) was the first newspaper published by Native Americans in the United States and the first published in a Native American language. The first issue was published in English and Cherokee on February 21, 1828, in New Echota, capital of the Cherokee Nation (present-day Georgia). The paper continued until 1834. The Cherokee Phoenix was revived in the 20th century, and today it publishes on the Web.

The Cherokee Phoenix has published intermittently since its beginning in New Echota. It is now published by the Cherokee Nation as a monthly broadsheet in Tahlequah, Oklahoma. The newspaper has modernized. It publishes on the Web and is available on the iPhone.

A digitized, searchable version of the paper is available through the University of Georgia Libraries and the Digital Library of Georgia. Transcriptions of the English-language portions of the 19th-century newspaper can be found at Western Carolina University's Hunter Library's Web site.

Artists Jeff Marley and Frank Brannon completed a collaborative project on October 19, 2013, in which they printed using Cherokee syllabary type in the print shop at New Echota. This was the first time syllabary printing type has been used at New Echota since 1835.

=== Cherokee Bible ===
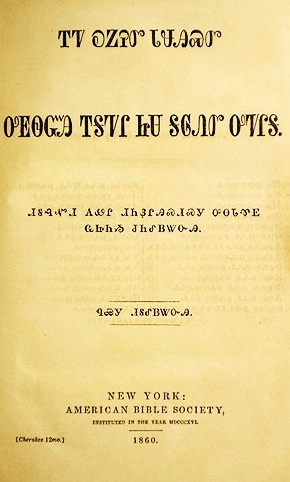
New Testament translated into the Cherokee language, front page in 1860.

In 1824 the first portion of the Bible was translated into the Cherokee language: John 3, translated by a native Cherokee, At-see (also known as John Arch). It was circulated in manuscript and received with enthusiasm, being widely recopied. He completed the Gospel of John by 1824 The complete New Testament was translated in September 1825 by David Brown, also a native Cherokee; this was also circulated in manuscript form, as a type for the Cherokee syllabary had not yet been created. Both Archer and Brown translated the full New Testament into Cherokee.

The first actual printing of a Bible portion in Cherokee appeared in the Missionary Herald of December 1827, and consisted of the first verse of Genesis, translated by Samuel Worcester. In 1828, David Brown, together with a man named George Lowrey, translated Matthew. This was printed in the Cherokee Phoenix from April 3, 1828 to July 29, 1829. It is uncertain if this translation was ever published in book form.

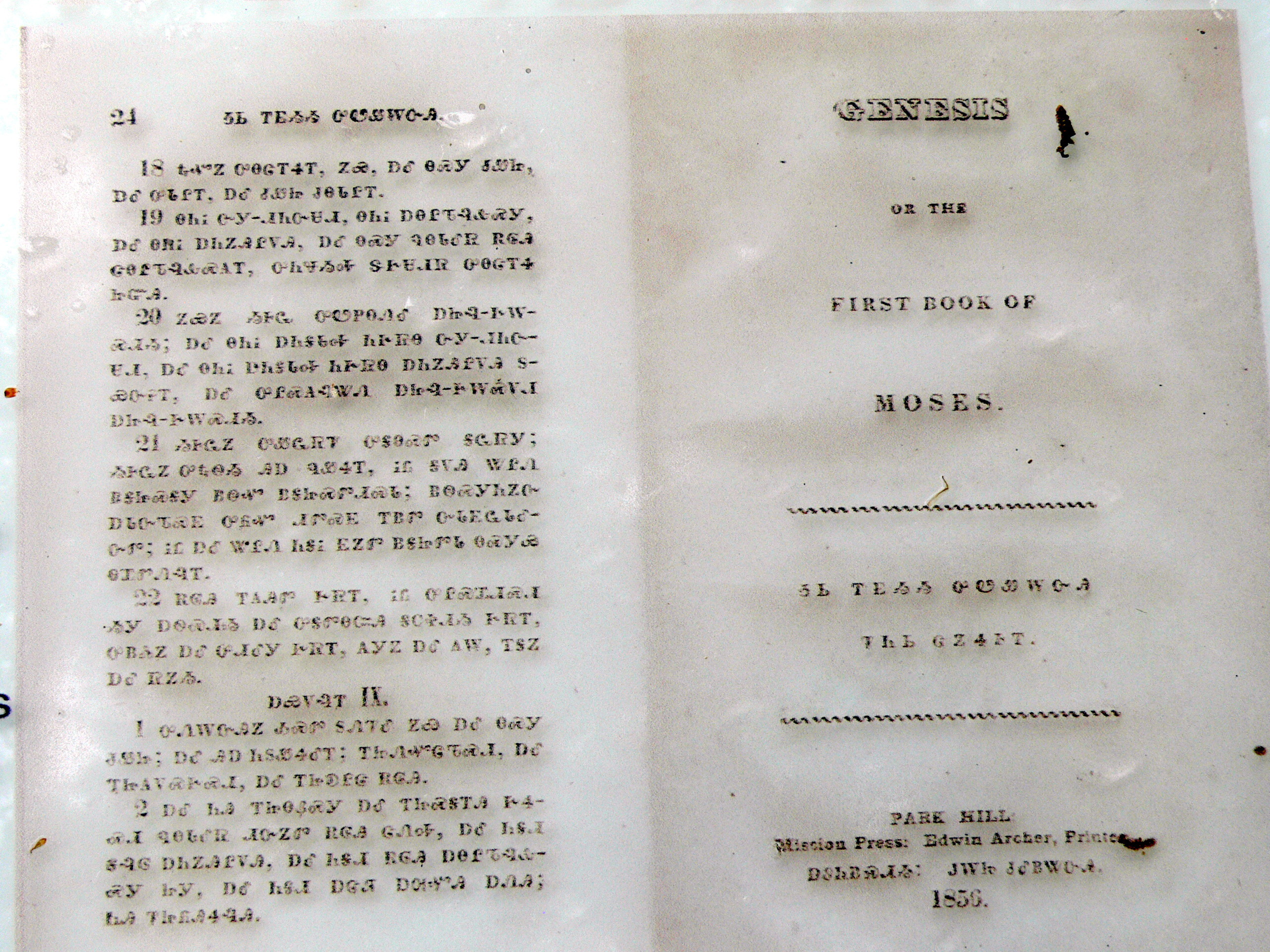
Translation of Genesis into the Cherokee language, 1856

Samuel Worcester, and Elias Boudinot, editor of the Cherokee Phoenix, published a revised translation of Matthew in 1829. This was published by the Cherokee National Press, New Echota. In the second edition, published in 1832, there is a statement that this translation had been "compared with the translation of George Lowrey and David Brown." A third edition was printed by the Park Hill Mission Press in 1840.

Worcester and Boudinot continued with translation, publishing Acts in 1833 and John in 1838. Worcester, together with Stephen Foreman, published John 1–3 in 1840, 1 and 2 Timothy in 1844, James in 1847, 1 and 2 Peter in 1848, Luke in 1850, Exodus in 1853, Genesis in 1856, Mark in 1857, and Romans through Ephesians in 1858. With the assistance of Charles C. Torrey, they published Philippians through 2 Thessalonians, Titus through Hebrews and Jude through Revelation in 1859. Besides the first three books translated together with Boudinot, Matthew (1829), Acts (1833), and John (1838), which were published in New Echota, Georgia, all the rest of Worcester's texts were published by the Park Hill Mission Press. In the meantime, Evan and John B. Jones had published Mark 1 and 2 Thessalonians, Titus, Jude, and Philemon in 1847, and Galatians through Colossians, 1 and 2 Peter in 1848 and Romans, 1 and 2 Corinthians, Hebrews and Revelation in 1849. Their work was published by the Cherokee Baptist Mission. The full New Testament was published by the American Bible Society in 1860.

With the help of Stephen Foreman, Worcester also translated portions of Psalms, Proverbs, and Isaiah.

Jonah, translated by Amory N. Chamberlain, was published in Tahlequah in 1888. Joshua was at an advanced stage of translation, and was perhaps even completed but was never published.

A "corrected version" of old Testament portions, prepared by M.A. Pearson, was published in 1953 by the American Bible Society.

Revisions of John (1948) and the New Testament (1951) were published in Westville, Oklahoma.

In 1965 the Perkins School of Theology published a translation of Haggai by Jack and Anna Kilpatrick.

Translation	John (ᏣᏂ) 3:16
American Bible Society 1860	ᎾᏍᎩᏰᏃ ᏂᎦᎥᎩ ᎤᏁᎳᏅᎯ ᎤᎨᏳᏒᎩ ᎡᎶᎯ, ᏕᏅᏲᏒᎩ ᎤᏤᎵᎦ ᎤᏪᏥ ᎤᏩᏒᎯᏳ ᎤᏕᏁᎸᎯ, ᎩᎶ ᎾᏍᎩ ᏱᎪᎯᏳᎲᏍᎦ ᎤᏲᎱᎯᏍᏗᏱ ᏂᎨᏒᎾ, ᎬᏂᏛᏉᏍᎩᏂ ᎤᏩᏛᏗ.
(Transliteration)	nasgiyeno nigavgi unelanvhi ugeyusvgi elohi, denvyosvgi utseliga uwetsi uwasvhiyu udenelvhi, gilo nasgi yigohiyuhvsga uyohuhisdiyi nigesvna, gvnidvquosgini uwadvdi.

=== Removal ===
Cherokee removal, part of the Trail of Tears, refers to the forced relocation between 1836 and 1839 of the Cherokee Nation from their lands in Georgia, South Carolina, North Carolina, Tennessee, Texas, and Alabama to the Indian Territory (present day Oklahoma) in the Central United States, which resulted in the death of an estimated 4000 Cherokee.

In the Cherokee language, the event is called Nu na da ul tsun yi (the place where they cried); another term is Tlo va sa (our removal). However, this phrase was not used by Cherokee at the time, and seems to be of Choctaw origin. The Cherokee were not the only American Indians to emigrate as a result of the Indian Removal efforts. American Indians were not only removed from the American South but also from the North, Midwest, Southwest, and Plains regions. The Choctaws, Chickasaws, and Creek Indians (Muskogee) emigrated reluctantly. The Seminoles in Florida resisted removal by guerrilla warfare with the United States Army for decades (1817–1850). Ultimately, some Seminoles remained in their Florida home country, while others were transported to Indian Territory in shackles.

== 20th century ==
The first known use of Native Americans in the American military to transmit messages under fire was a group of Cherokee troops utilized by the American 30th Infantry Division serving alongside the British during the Second Battle of the Somme. According to the Division Signal Officer, this took place in September 1918. Their unit was under British command at the time. The Cherokee language was also used by code talkers in the 36th Division of the 142nd Infantry Regiment during World War I, in which Cherokee troops were discovered by the U.S. Army by happenstance to speak the Cherokee language which their enemies could not understand. Native American code talkers during World War I primarily used type 2 code talking. The Cherokee language was later utilized to transmit secret messages in the 32nd Infantry Division of the U.S. Army in Normandy, Europe during World War II.

Over the course of the 19th century and into the 20th century, American Indian boarding schools were set up by the United States government to assimilate Native Americans into Western society. Such schools discouraged and even prohibited use of Native American languages and taught students that a tribal identity was inferior. Instead, students were forced to speak and think in English. If they were caught "speaking Indian" they were punished, sometimes severely beaten with a leather belt and sometimes soap was put into their mouths, in an attempt to "wash the language out." A Cherokee Boarding School, founded in 1880, likewise maintained an English-only policy specifically designed to eradicate the Cherokee language. The purpose of the boarding schools was to forcibly acculturate Cherokee to mainstream white society. Indigenous children were forcibly taken from their homes in an effort to "kill the Indian and save the man." At these schools Indian children were given "white" names, wardrobes, and haircuts, and forced to speak only English. This school enacted English-only rules until 1933, having devastating effects on Cherokee fluency. U.S. policies of Indian assimilation lasted into the 1950s.

== 21st century ==
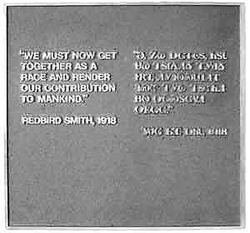
Bilingual plaque in Cherokee and English. Memorial with a quote from the famous Keetoowah Society member and Cherokee statesman Redbird Smith.

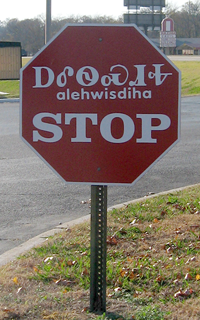
Bilingual stop sign in English and Cherokee, using the Latin alphabet and the Cherokee syllabary, Tahlequah, Oklahoma

For years, many people wrote transliterated Cherokee on the internet or used poorly compatible fonts to type out the syllabary. However, since the fairly recent addition of the Cherokee syllables to Unicode, the Cherokee language is experiencing a renaissance in its use on the Internet. The entire New Testament is online in the Cherokee syllabary. Most Linux distributions support Cherokee input and display in any font containing the characters in Unicode environments. Windows 8, the first Windows release in Cherokee, contains "nearly 180,000 words and phrases" in Cherokee, and is the first Windows release in a Native American language.

Beginning in 2001, the Cherokee Bible Project began posting the New Testament and portions of Old Testament Books on the internet. The New Testament is completely present online as are several Old Testament books including Genesis, Haggai, and Jonah. Cherokee Bible Project

Since 2003, all Apple computers come with a Cherokee font installed. Cherokee Nation members Joseph L. Erb, Roy Boney, Jr., and Thomas Jeff Edwards worked with Apple to bring official Cherokee language support to the iPhone and iPod Touch in iOS 4.1 (released September 8, 2010) and for the iPad with iOS 4.2.1, which was released on November 22, 2010. A number of Cherokee language apps are available for iPhone, iPad, and other iOS devices.

On March 25, 2011, Google announced the option to perform searches in Cherokee. As of November 2012, Gmail is supported in Cherokee.

A video game for learning the Cherokee language, "Talking Games", was released in March 2013.

The Cherokee language has also made some appearances in popular culture which have helped it further develop. The theme song "I Will Find You" from the 1992 film The Last of the Mohicans by the band Clannad features Máire Brennan singing in Cherokee as well as Mohican. Cherokee rapper Litefoot incorporates Cherokee into songs, as do Rita Coolidge's band Walela and the intertribal drum group, Feather River Singers.

Resources helping to expand and develop Cherokee include books. Among books published in the Cherokee language are the following:

- Awi Uniyvsdi Kanohelvdi ᎠᏫ ᎤᏂᏴᏍᏗ ᎧᏃᎮᎸᏗ: The Park Hill Tales. (2006) Sixkiller, Dennis, ed.
- Baptism: The Mode
- Cherokee Almanac (1860)
- "Christmas in those Days"
- Cherokee Driver's Manual
- Cherokee Elementary Arithmetic (1870)
- "The Cherokee People Today"
- Cherokee Psalms: A Collection of Hymns in the Cherokee Language (1991). Sharpe, J. Ed., ed. and Daniel Scott, trans. ISBN 978-0-935741-16-2
- Cherokee Spelling Book (1924). J. D. Wofford
- Cherokee Stories. (1966) Spade & Walker
- Cherokee Vision of Elohi (1981 and 1997). Meredith, Howard, Virginia Sobral, and Wesley Proctor. ISBN 978-0-9660164-0-6
- The Four Gospels and Selected Psalms in Cherokee: A Companion to the Syllabary New Testament (2004). Holmes, Ruth Bradley. ISBN 978-0-8061-3628-8.
- Na Tsoi Yona Ꮎ ᏦᎢ ᏲᎾ: The Three Bears. (2007) Keeter, Ray D. and Wynema Smith. ISBN 978-0-9777339-0-3
- Na Usdi Gigage Agisi Tsitaga Ꮎ ᎤᏍᏗ ᎩᎦᎨ ᎠᎩᏏ: The Little Red Hen. (2007) Smith, Wynema and Ray D. Keeter. ISBN 978-0-9777339-1-0.

The Cherokee Nation now has a radio show called "Cherokee Voices, Cherokee Sounds" that plays songs in the Cherokee language, interviews speakers of the Cherokee language, and releases news and podcasts in both Cherokee and English. The show is hosted by Dennis Sixkiller and has been in operation since 2004. "Cherokee Voices, Cherokee Sounds" currently airs on the radio in the Tahlequah area on Lakes Country 102.1 FM on Sundays from 8 a.m. until 9 a.m. and on Classic Country KTLQ 1350 AM from 12 p.m. until 1 p.m. and Wednesdays from 5 p.m. until 6 p.m. In the Claremore area, the show airs on the Rogers State University radio station, KRSC – 91.3 FM, Saturdays from 8 a.m. to 9 a.m., and Sundays from 12 p.m. until 1 p.m. The show also airs on Siloam Springs, AR, station KUOA – 1290 AM, on Sundays from 9 a.m. until 10 a.m.

=== Danger of extinction ===
In 2019, the Tri-Council of Cherokee tribes declared a state of emergency for the language due to the threat of it going extinct, calling for the enhancement of revitalization programs.

=== Immersion education ===
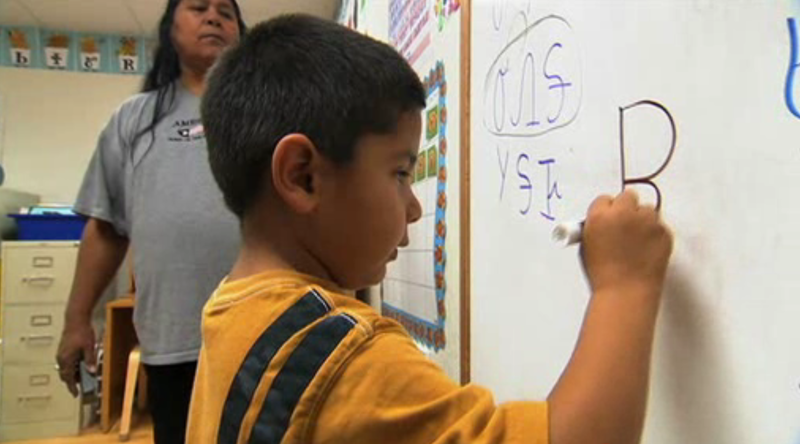
Oklahoma Cherokee language immersion school student writing in the Cherokee syllabary.

In 2005 the Eastern Band of the Cherokee Nation instituted a 10-year language preservation plan that involved growing new fluent speakers of the Cherokee language, from childhood on up, through school immersion programs as well as collaborative community efforts to continue to use the language at home. This plan was part of an ambitious goal that in 50 years, 80% or more of the Cherokee people will be fluent in the language. The Cherokee Preservation Foundation has invested $3 million into opening schools, training teachers, and developing curricula for language education, as well as initiating community gatherings where the language can be actively used. Formed in 2006, the Kituwah Preservation & Education Program (KPEP) on the Qualla Boundary focuses on language immersion programs for children from birth to fifth grade, developing cultural resources for the general public and community language programs to foster the Cherokee language among adults. KPEP operates the New Kituwah Academy, a Cherokee immersion school. There is also the Cherokee Immersion School in Tahlequah, Oklahoma that educates students from pre-school through eighth grade.
