= Sequoyah Lake =

Sequoyah Lake or Lake Sequoyah may refer to:

- Lake Sequoyah (Mississippi)
- Sequoyah Lake (Georgia)
