= Timeline of women in warfare in Colonial America =

== Timeline of women in warfare from 1750 until 1799 in America ==
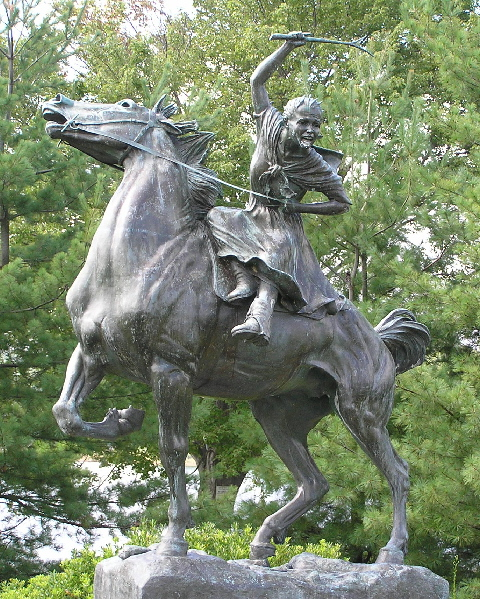
Statue of Sybil Ludington

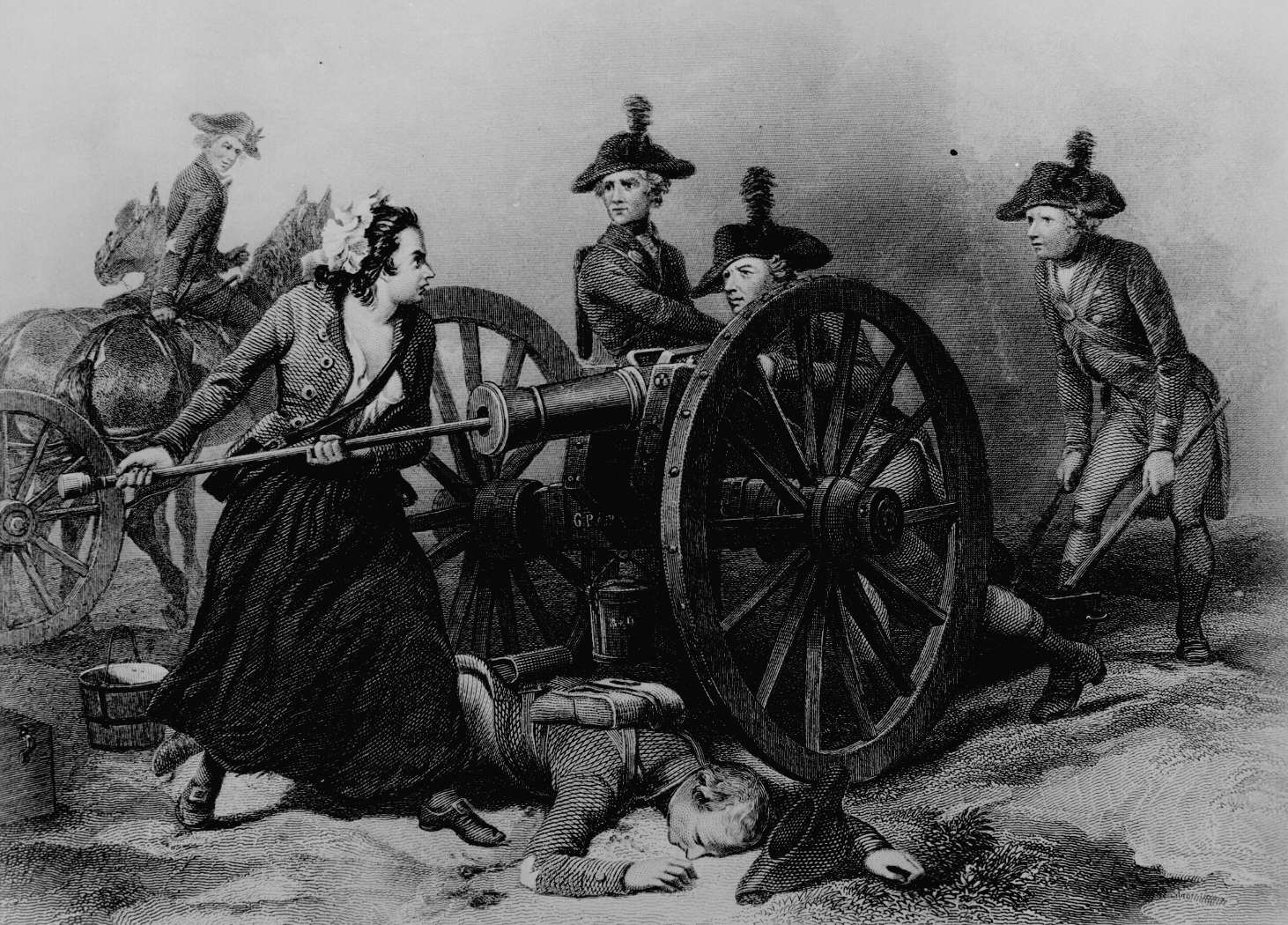
Molly Pitcher depicted in 1859 engraving

=== 1750s ===
- 1754–1763: French and Indian War. Seneca leader Queen Alliquippa is a key ally of the British.
- 1755: Cherokee leader Nancy Ward fights side-by-side with her husband at the Battle of Taliwa. When her husband is killed, she picked up his rifle and led the Cherokee to victory.

=== 1770s ===
- 1770s: During the American Revolution, women served on the battlefield as nurses, water bearers, cooks, launderers and saboteurs.
- 1770s: Cherokee woman Cuhtahlatah causes her people to rally in battle by attacking the enemy after her husband was killed.
- 1770s: Elizabeth Hutchinson Jackson, the mother of Andrew Jackson, treats and nurses sick and wounded Continental soldiers in American Revolutionary War on British prison ship, dying of cholera as a result.
- December 11, 1775: Jemima Warner was killed by an enemy bullet during the siege of Quebec.
- 1776: Anna Maria Lane, disguised as a man, joins the Continental Army with her husband and fights four battles in the American Revolutionary War. She later receives a pension for her courage after she is wounded in the Battle of Germantown.
- November 16, 1776: Margaret Corbin assists her husband in manning the cannons while fighting the British in battle in the American Revolutionary War. When her husband is killed, she mans the cannons alone. She later became the first woman to earn a military pension.
- April 26, 1777: Sybil Ludington is said to have warned colonists that the British were burning the city of Danbury, Connecticut, during the American Revolution; these accounts, originating from the Ludington family, are questioned by modern scholars.
- 1777: Mademoiselle Leverriére fights a duel with a man in France.
- 1778: Molly Pitcher (born Mary Ludwig in 1754) married John Hays in 1769. Her husband fought for the Continental Army at the Battle of Monmouth (New Jersey) on June 28, 1778. During the battle, she brought pitchers of water to her husband and fellow soldiers, thus earning the appellation Molly Pitcher. When her husband succumbed to exhaustion, she picked up his rifle and fought against the British.

=== 1780s ===
- 1781: Kate Barry warns the American militia that the British were approaching before the Battle of Cowpens. Her warning gives the colonists enough time to prepare and win the battle.
- 1782–1783: Deborah Sampson serves in the American army during the American Revolutionary War while disguised as a man. She is the first known American woman from Massachusetts to join the military, the first to fight in combat, and the first to receive a military pension.
- 1783: Kauwahine, wife of King Kahekili II of Maui, fought valiantly at his side and defeated the Oahuan army under King Kahahana at the Battle of Kaheiki Stream.
