= George Lowrey =

Cherokee statesman and Assistant Principal Chief (c.1770–1852)

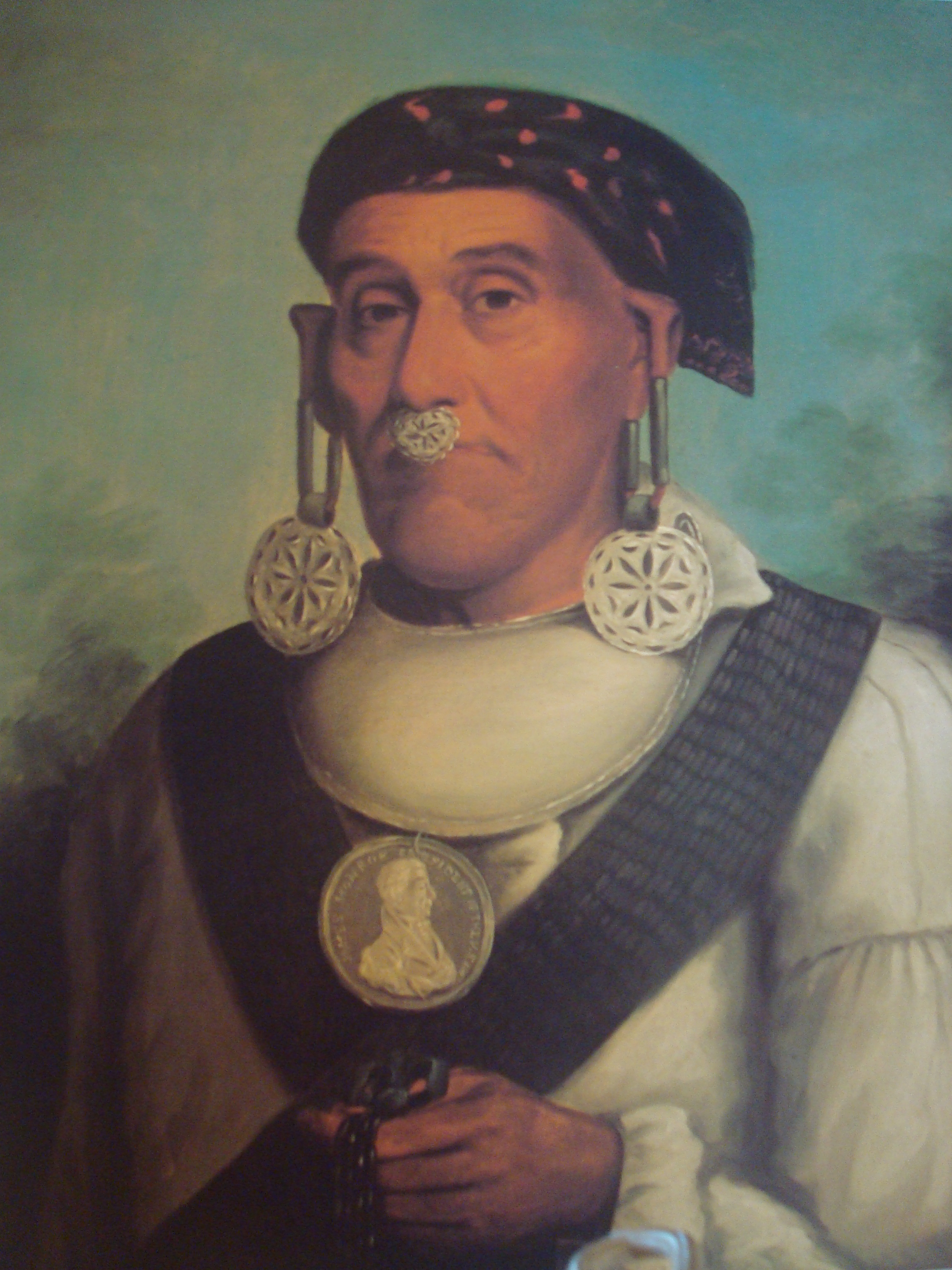
- Portrait of George Lowrey (artist unknown, 19th century), Gilcrease Museum
- Born: c. 1770; Tellico Plains, Monroe County, Tennessee
- Died: October 20, 1852 (aged 81–82); Cherokee Nation, Indian Territory
- Other names: Tsi-tsa-Lawili; Agili
- Occupations: Statesman; translator; political leader
- Known for: Assistant Principal Chief of the Cherokee Nation; member of the 1827 and 1839 constitutional conventions
- Spouse: Lucy Benge
- Children: 10
- Relatives: Wahnenauhi (granddaughter)

George Lowrey (also Lowery or Lowry) or Tsa-Tsi-Agi-Li (c. 1770 – 20 October 1852) was a Cherokee chief, political leader, translator, and long‑serving public official in the Cherokee Nation. Of mixed Cherokee and white ancestry, he held numerous national offices, including multiple terms as Assistant Principal Chief, and participated in the creation of both the 1827 and 1839 Cherokee constitutions.

== Early life ==
Lowrey was born around 1770, the son of George Lowrey, a trader from Virginia, and Nannie (Nancy) Watts of the Ani‑Gilohi (Long Hair) clan. His Cherokee names were recorded by John Howard Payne in the 1830s as Tsi‑tsa‑Lawili or Agili. He may have been the unnamed Cherokee youth who accompanied a delegation to Philadelphia in 1792.

Lowrey settled near Battle Creek in the Sequatchie Valley during the Chickamauga period and, after the Creek War, relocated to Wills Town.

Lowrey has been described as a cousin of Sequoyah, inventor of the Cherokee syllabary, though other accounts make his wife, Lucy Benge, Sequoyah's half-sister.

== Political career ==
By the early nineteenth century, Lowrey was a local chief and frequent correspondent of U.S. Indian Agent Return J. Meigs, writing from “Lowryville” on issues including white intruders, stolen horses, and supply shortages. He took a land reservation under the Treaty of 1819 and later helped negotiate the treaty as part of the Cherokee delegation.

Lowrey held numerous public offices in the Cherokee Nation. His tombstone erected by order of the National Council records that he served as:

- Captain of the Lighthorse (1810)
- Member of the First National Committee (1814)
- Delegate to President George Washington (1791–1792)
- Member of the 1827 Constitutional Convention
- Member of the 1839 Constitutional Convention
- Assistant Principal Chief (first elected 1828, and repeatedly thereafter)
- Member of the Executive Council at the time of his death

A missionary statement on the Cherokee government published in 1831 described him as second principal chief and "one-half Cherokee." Although some later accounts claimed he was a major in the War of 1812, muster rolls do not list him; his brother John served in that capacity.

== Translation work ==
Lowrey was among the wealthy, acculturated Cherokee who were affiliated with the American Board (Presbyterian) mission church in the 1820s and 1830s. He collaborated with his son-in-law David Brown to translate portions of the New Testament into the Cherokee syllabary. Their rendering of the Gospel of Matthew was serialized in the Cherokee Phoenix beginning in 1828. The printed Gospel of Matthew translated by Samuel Worcester and Elias Boudinot (1829; 2nd ed. 1832) states on its title page that it was "compared with the translation of George Lowrey and David Brown."

He also authored a tract on temperance in Cherokee.

== Removal and later life ==
Lowrey was among the wealthy, slaveholding elite of the Cherokee Nation. The historian Natalie Joy notes that the editor Elias Boudinot and his family rented an enslaved man named July from Lowrey around 1832. In the 1835 Cherokee census, Lowrey and his wife, recorded in Wills Valley in present-day Alabama, were enumerated as a household owning twenty enslaved people, placing the family among the small slaveholding elite that held roughly two-thirds of the enslaved people in the Cherokee Nation.

In June 1838, he and his family were among the roughly 500 Alabama Cherokees who camped near Fort Payne before being forcibly removed to Indian Territory. Lowrey served as assistant to John Benge, conductor of the detachment that left Wills Valley that autumn.

Lowrey died on 20 October 1852 in the Tahlequah District of the Cherokee Nation. He was buried in the old Methodist burying ground in the southern part of Tahlequah, beneath a marble monument erected by act of the Cherokee National Council. The council later authorized the removal of his remains to the Tahlequah City Cemetery. His tombstone describes him as "An Honest Man. A Spotless Patriot. A Devoted Christian" and notes his long service as a ruling elder and deacon in Cherokee churches.

== Family ==
Lowrey married Lucy Benge. Starr's genealogy of the Cherokee places the family within the line of Sequoyah and records their children as Elizabeth, Jennie, Eliza, James, Susan, George, Lydia, Rachel (married to David Brown), John, and Anderson Pierce Lowrey, with Archibald, Washington, and Charles Lowrey also listed.

Through his daughter Lydia, who married Milo Hoyt, Lowrey was the grandfather of Wahnenauhi (Lucy Lowrey Hoyt Keys), author of an 1889 manuscript history of the Cherokee written in the syllabary.

== See also ==
- Bible translations into Cherokee
- History of the Cherokee language
- Native American temperance activists
