= Bible translations into Cherokee =

Portions of the Bible have been translated into the Cherokee language since 1824 with translation work ongoing under the auspices of the Cherokee Bible Project (ᏣᎳᎩ ᏧᎭᎨᏓᎪᏪᎵ ᎠᏎᎸᎯ).

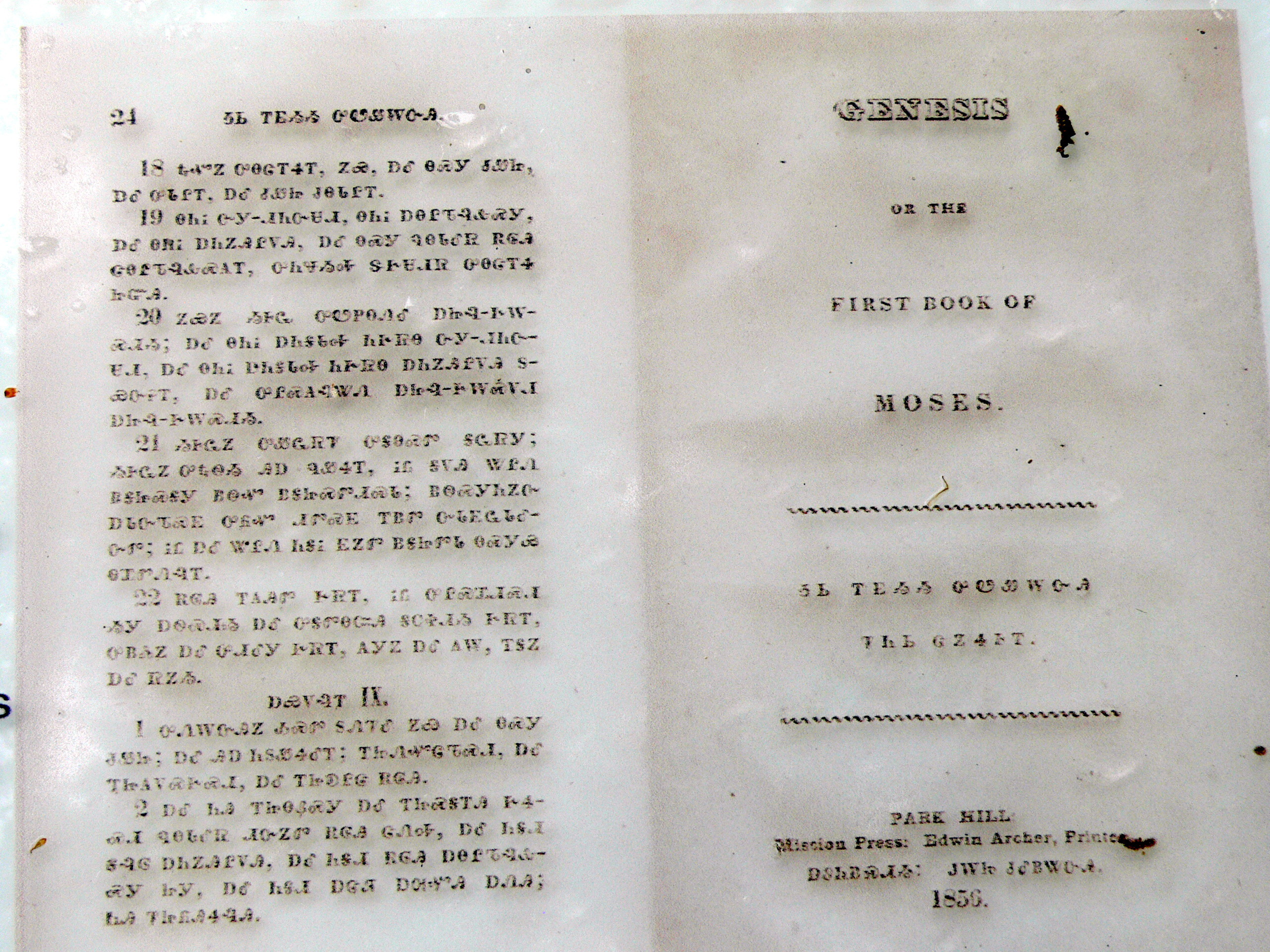
Genesis in Cherokee (1856)

== History ==
In 1824, John 3, the first portion of the Bible, was translated into the Cherokee language by Cherokee native ᎠᏥ (John A'tsi Arch). It was circulated in manuscript, and received with wonderful avidity, being copied hundreds of times. He completed the Gospel of John in 1824.

David Brown, also a native Cherokee, completed a translation of the New Testament in September 1825. It was circulated only in handwritten manuscript form, as printing type for the Cherokee syllabary had not yet been created.

Both Arch and Brown translated the full New Testament into Cherokee.

Samuel Worcester and Elias Boudinot, editor of the Cherokee Phoenix, published a revised translation of Matthew in 1829. This was published by the Cherokee National Press, New Echota. In the second edition, published in 1832, there is a statement that this translation had been "compared with the translation of George Lowrey and David Brown."

Worcester and Boudinot continued with translation, publishing Acts in 1833 and John in 1838. Worcester, together with Stephen Foreman, published John 1–3 in 1840, 1 and 2 Timothy in 1844, James in 1847, 1 and 2 Peter in 1848, Luke in 1850, Exodus in 1853, Genesis in 1856, Mark in 1857, and Romans through Ephesians in 1858. With the assistance of Charles C. Torrey, they published Philippians through 2 Thessalonians, Titus through Hebrews and Jude through Revelation in 1859. Besides the first three books translated together with Boudinot, Matthew (1829), Acts (1833), and John (1838), which were published in New Echota, Georgia, all the rest of Worcester's texts were published by the Park Hill Mission Press. In the meantime, Evan and John B. Jones had published Mark, 1 and 2 Thessalonians, Titus, Jude, and Philemon in 1847, and Galatians through Colossians, 1 and 2 Peter in 1848 and Romans, 1 and 2 Corinthians, Hebrews and Revelation in 1849. Their work was published by the Cherokee Baptist Mission.

With the help of Stephen Foreman, Worcester also translated portions of Psalms, Proverbs, and Isaiah.

Jonah, translated by Amory N. Chamberlain, was published in Tahlequah in 1888. Joshua was at an advanced stage of translation, and was perhaps even completed.

Jesse Bushyhead translated Genesis with Evan Jones.

Pre–20th-century Cherokee Bible translations
Translator(s)	Book(s)	Year(s)	Publication details	Notes
ᎠᏥ (John Arch)	John 3; Gospel of John (manuscript)	1824	Circulated in manuscript	First known Cherokee Bible translation
David Brown	New Testament (manuscript)	1825	Circulated in manuscript	Complete New Testament in Cherokee
David Brown; George Lowrey	Matthew	1828–1829	Serialized in the Cherokee Phoenix	First printed Cherokee biblical text
Samuel Worcester; Elias Boudinot	Matthew (revised); Acts; John	1829; 1833; 1838	Cherokee National Press, New Echota	Revised Matthew (1829); Acts (1833); John (1838)
Samuel Worcester; Stephen Foreman	John 1–3; 1 Timothy; 2 Timothy; James; 1 Peter; 2 Peter; Luke; Exodus; Genesis; Mark; Romans; 1 Corinthians; 2 Corinthians; Galatians; Ephesians	1840–1858	Park Hill Mission Press	Progressive New Testament and Old Testament translations
Samuel Worcester; Stephen Foreman; Charles C. Torrey	Philippians; Colossians; 1 Thessalonians; 2 Thessalonians; Titus; Philemon; Hebrews; Jude; Revelation	1859	Park Hill Mission Press	Completion of remaining New Testament books
Evan Jones; John B. Jones	Mark; 1 Thessalonians; 2 Thessalonians; Titus; Jude; Philemon; Galatians; Ephesians; Philippians; Colossians; 1 Corinthians; 2 Corinthians; Romans; Hebrews; Revelation	1847–1849	Cherokee Baptist Mission	Alternative Baptist translations of many New Testament books
Evan Jones; Jesse Bushyhead	Genesis	mid–19th century	Cherokee Baptist Mission	Old Testament translation
Samuel Worcester; Stephen Foreman	Psalms (portions); Proverbs (portions); Isaiah (portions)	mid–19th century	Park Hill Mission Press	Partial Old Testament translations
Amory N. Chamberlain	Jonah; Joshua (in progress)	1888	Published in Tahlequah	Late 19th-century Old Testament translation

=== 20th century ===
Revisions of John (1948) and the New Testament (1951) were published in Westville, Oklahoma.

In 1965, the Perkins School of Theology published a translation of Haggai by Jack and Anna Kilpatrick.

=== 21st century ===
In 2001, the Cherokee Bible Project, with permission from the American Bible Society, made the Gospel of John available online in both Cherokee Syllabary and in Latin phonetic transliteration with English translation. The earliest remaining example of such bilingual versions is from 2003. The entire New Testament, as well as portions of the Old Testament, were made available in 2005, including the complete books of Jonah, Haggai, Genesis, Exodus, and portions of Kings, Proverbs, Psalms, Isaiah, Samuel, and Obadiah. The printed copy of Haggai was donated by a generous supporter after it was located in a library discard and posted online in 2013.

Between 2006 and 2019, Timothy Legg led a project to compare the English and Cherokee translations of the New Testament, with verse-by-verse scans and transcriptions.

== See also ==
- Sequoyah

== Additional sources ==
- Bender, Margaret C., and Thomas N. Belt. The new voice of God: Language, worldview, and the Cherokee Bible. University of Oklahoma Press, 2025.
