= Big Skin Bayou =

River in Oklahoma, United States

Coordinates: 35°19′38″N 94°34′08″W

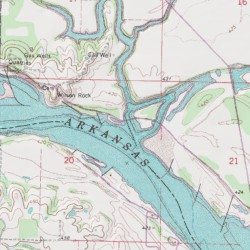

Big Skin Bayou, also known as Skin Bayou or Big Skin Creek, is a tributary of the Arkansas River located in Sequoyah County, Oklahoma. It takes its name from the word "skein" which are loose, tangled layers of yarn. A large, colorful canebrake resembling yarn; formed a near impenetrable, natural wall near the mouth of the creek before it was cleared for farming. French trappers and explorers named several of the major tributaries of the Arkansas River in Oklahoma; as it was once a part of the French Territory of Louisiana that was later the Louisiana Purchase. At one time, there were large rock bluffs near Big Skin's confluence with the Arkansas (most of these bluffs were later destroyed to provide rock fill for the W.D. Mayo Lock and Dam). The bluff on the south side (LeFLore County side) of the river and across from Big Skin's confluence was known as Swallow Rock, named for the birds that nested there and was the site of the old Fort Coffee. The bluff on the north side of the river (Sequoyah County side) and west of Big Skin is known as Wilson Rock (on some maps listed as Wilson's Rock). Both bluffs formed a natural wharf and served as historic steamboat landings and ferry crossings. The cemetery at Wilson Rock contains the graves of local residents as well as some travelers that fell victim to the river over the years. Tiana, the wife of the famed Texan Sam Houston was buried at Wilson Rock Cemetery for several years until she was moved to a cemetery near Fort Gibson. Wilson Rock and Big Skin Bayou were also drop off points for several groups of Cherokees that were forced to relocate to that part of Oklahoma/Indian Territory on the Trail of Tears. The relocated tribesmen that disembarked here would then follow the creek into the interior parts of Skin Bayou District where they settled. Most of eastern Sequoyah County was included in the "Skin Bayou District" of Cherokee Nation, Indian Territory; which also took its name from the creek.

The headwaters of Big Skin Creek is located north of the Arkansas River, in the vicinity of Polecat Hollow, which is located in the Brushy Mountains of northern Sequoyah and southern Adair Counties. The creek flows in a southeasterly direction intersecting with Black Creek, near Sequoyah's Cabin and the community of Maple. Sequoyah was a respected elder of the Cherokee Tribe and the inventor of the Cherokee Syllabary (alphabet). After passing Sequoyah's Cabin, the creek widens and the flow begins to slow as it approaches U.S. Highway 64, near Muldrow, Oklahoma. It is at this point that is becomes known as Big Skin Bayou forming the north and east border of the Redland community. It flows under U.S. Interstate 40, which is just north of where it intersects with Little Skin Bayou and Tomlin Branch near the community of Baldridge; it continues southeast passing south of the Lee's Chapel community where the bayou splits, forming Breedlove Island and Cherokee Chute before emptying into the Arkansas River just upstream of the W.D. Mayo Lock and Dam.
