= Sequoyah Lake (Georgia) =

- Location within Georgia Location within the United States
- Location: Pickens County, Georgia
- Coordinates: 34°32′43″N 84°21′59″W
- Type: reservoir
- Basin countries: United States
- Surface elevation: 2,769 ft (844 m)

Sequoyah Lake is a reservoir in the U.S. state of Georgia.

Sequoyah Lake was named after Sequoyah (1767–1843), an Indian silversmith and inventor of the Cherokee syllabary. Variant names are "Lake Sequoyah" and "Sequoia Lake".
