= Cuhtahlatah =

Cherokee woman

Cuhtahlatah (Cherokee: Gatûñ'lätï) was a Cherokee woman who lived during the period of the American Revolutionary War. Her name means "wild hemp". When her husband was killed in battle, she grabbed his tomahawk and attacked the enemy, screaming "Kill! Kill!". Her people had been in retreat, but her actions inspired them to rally and they gained victory in the battle.) Her story is recounted in the Wahnenauhi manuscript of 1889.

== See also ==
- Cherokee mythology
