= Wahnenauhi =

Cherokee writer

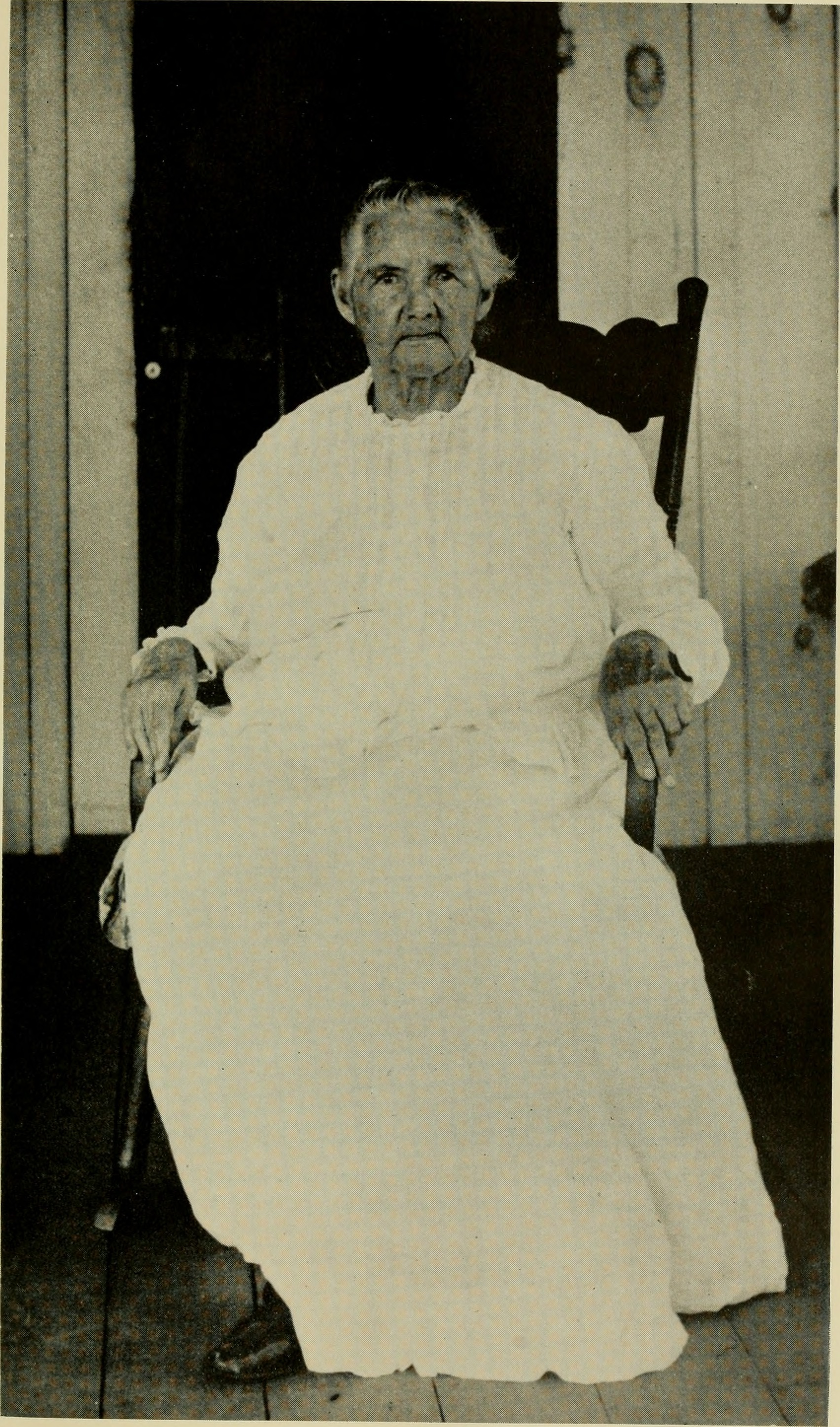
- Wahnenauhi, c.1900
- Born: Lucy Lowrey Hoyt Keys c. 1831; Willstown, Cherokee Nation (now Alabama)
- Died: 1912 (approx. 81 years)
- Occupation: Writer
- Notable work: Historical Sketches of the Cherokees, Together with Some of their Customs, Traditions, and Superstitions

Wahnenauhi (born Lucy Lowrey Hoyt Keys; c. 1831 - 1912) was a Cherokee woman whose writings on the history and culture of Cherokee Indian people were published by the Bureau of American Ethnology in 1889. Her collection of writings, entitled Historical Sketches of the Cherokees, Together with Some of their Customs, Traditions, and Superstitions, features historical accounts, legends, traditional practices, and stories that highlight aspects of Cherokee culture. Whanenauhi wrote the manuscript at a time when Cherokee acculturation into white society was heavily encouraged by her peers, and her work is often considered a backlash against that attitude.

== Early life ==
Wahnenauhi was born September 26, 1831 in Willstown, Alabama to Dr. Milo Hoyt, and Lydia Lowrey, daughter of Cherokee chief George Lowrey. As a member of a Cherokee family with an elite social status, Wahnenauhi was well educated, and became one of the first students to ever graduate from the Cherokee Female Seminary in February 1855. Wahnenauhi came from a prominent family with mixed Amerindian heritage, and was related by marriage to Principal Chief John Ross. Her upbringing demanded that she both conform to the ideals of assimilation and maintain an intellectual connection to the traditions of her Indigenous heritage. This personal conflict had a major influence on her writings later in life, and Wahnenauhi joined other female indigenous activists like Nacissa Chisholm Owen and Sarah Winnemucca to reclaim traditional Indian practices through education and literature.

== Writings ==
Wahnenauhi's manuscript entitled Historical Sketches of the Cherokees, Together with Some of their Customs, Traditions, and Superstitions is a sociological outline of many traditional Cherokee practices, teachings, stories, and histories. In September 1889, at the age of 58, Wahnenauhi sent her collection of writings to the Bureau of Ethnology (known today as the Bureau of American Ethnology) with a note offering her 70-page manuscript for editing and publication. In November 1889, the Bureau of Ethnology bought the rights to Wahnenauhi's manuscript for $10.00, and published her ethnographic record of the Cherokee people.

== Legacy ==
Wahnenauhi's work is considered a significant contribution to the American Indian traditionalist reform movements of the late nineteenth and early twentieth centuries. Her manuscript is contemporary with many other writers in the traditionalist reform movement, and takes on a preservationist philosophy through the re-telling of many of the old ways of the Cherokee peoples.
