= David Brown (translator) =

Cherokee clergyman and translator (1790-1829)

- A-wih
- Born: c.1790 Wills Valley, Etowah County, Alabama
- Died: September 14, 1829; Creek Path, Mississippi
- Occupations: clergyman; translator

David Brown (Cherokee: A-wih) (c.1790 – September 14, 1829) was a Cherokee clergyman and translator who worked in Mississippi as a missionary to the Cherokee. As a youth, he was educated in schools for Native Americans in Tennessee and Connecticut. He also attended Andover Theological Seminary in Massachusetts before returning to the South.

== Biography ==
Brown was born in Wills Valley, Alabama in the late 18th century, according to Ricky. His father was mixed-race, Cherokee and white. Then part of Cherokee territory, the area is in present-day Etowah County, Alabama, in the northern part of the state.

Will's Town was founded about 1770 as a trading post on Big Wills Creek. The post and creek are said to have been named for Red Headed Will, a local Cherokee chief. He inherited his distinctive hair from his white father.

Brown, or A-wih, as he was known in Cherokee, and his sister Catharine, born about 1800, were sent as youths to the boarding school of Cyrus Kingsbury in Tennessee. It had been established by Moravian missionaries to educate Native American children. It was about 100 miles (160 km) from their home in Alabama. Catharine became literate in English there.

Brown became a preacher and an interpreter. He also served as secretary to the Cherokee Treaty Party. In November 1819, he assisted John Arch in the preparation and printing of a Cherokee spelling book.

In the spring of 1820, Brown went to Cornwall, Connecticut, for more education. Catharine also studied there and learned English. The school was for Native Americans. After two years there, Brown spent a year at Andover Theological Seminary in Massachusetts, further preparing for ministry.

Returning to the South, Brown served as a missionary at Creek Path, in what became Mississippi. He claimed in an 1825 letter that the people were adopting the new religion of Christianity. Brown died September 14, 1829, in Creek Path.

This was several years before most of the Cherokee were forced on the Trail of Tears to Indian Territory west of the Mississippi River under the Indian Removal Act of 1830. They were dispossessed of most of their eastern lands by the United States government in defiance of treaty obligations.
