= American Widow Project =

American Widow Project (AWP) is a non-profit organization providing peer to peer support to a new generation of military widows grieving the loss of a spouse in the United States armed forces.

== History ==
AWP was founded in 2007 by Taryn Davis of San Marcos, TX after her husband, CPL Michael Davis, was killed in action in the Iraq war on May 21, 2007. Finding herself a widow at the age of 22, she discovered that there were few resources to help young military widows. To date, her nonprofit has provided a community of support to more than 900 young military widows.

Following her grief and confusion, four months later she began work on a documentary speaking to military widows, hearing their stories of love, tragedy and overall survival. The documentary was shown to military widows who gathered in Austin, Texas from across the country in July 2008, for the official "launch" of the American Widow Project. During the launch In Their Boots was on location to film and interview widows.

Since then, the AWP has conducted several events through the country to unite military widows to celebrate their survival, honor their loved ones' sacrifice, and provide a healing environment with others who share their experiences. The core philosophy of the AWP is to serve the interests of the military widow community. AWP quarterly events are invaluable in unifying this growing band of young military widows. Other AWP services further solidify the comprehensive support network to its members. A 24/7 hotline enables an immediate connection to another widow. A documentary produced by the AWP is provided free of charge to all military widows. The AWP official website is the focal point for a multitude of resources and information, including upcoming events and personal accounts from the widows themselves. Finally, an array of interactive social networking sites serves as a hub for ongoing dynamic communication and fellowship.

The American Widow Project has been nationally recognized by a multitude of media outlets such as: ABC news with Bob Woodruff, NPR, CNN, CBS, ABC News, Military.com, The Washington Times, USAA Magazine, Los Angeles Times, The Fayetteville Observer, San Marcos Daily Record, The Huffington Post, American Forces Network, Fort Hood Sentinel, The Rosie O'Donnell Radio Show, Jezebel, Lemondrop, YouServed Radio, Soldiers Angels Forum, In Their Boots, in addition to many others. Taryn was nominated for the 2010 Loreal Paris Women of Worth award and was named the 2010 L'Oreal Woman of Worth on December 9, 2010. L'Oreal Taryn was recently chosen as one of five nominees for the 2011 Diane Von Furstenberg "People's Voice Award" Diane Von Furstenberg

== Sources ==
- http://www.americanwidowproject.org
- https://abcnews.go.com/WN/WoodruffReports/story?id=7159852&page=1
- https://www.npr.org/2008/11/11/96844953/american-widow-project-born-from-grief
- blogs.cnn.com
- http://cbs11tv.com/seenon/American.Widow.Project.2.763522.html
- https://abcnews.go.com/Video/playerIndex?id=4368447
- http://www.military.com/military-report/organization--helps-military-widows?ESRC=miltrep.nl
- http://www.washingtontimes.com/news/2010/apr/19/army-widow-helps-heal-the-wound/
- https://web.archive.org/web/20110717174834/http://content.usaa.com/mcontent/static_assets/Media/dotcom_fall_2009.pdf?cacheid=2562377476
- https://web.archive.org/web/20110717175013/https://content.usaa.com/mcontent/static_assets/Media/USAA_Mag_winter_2009.pdf?cacheid=764885672
- Los Angeles Times
- http://www.fayobserver.com/Articles/2009/06/25/912419
- https://web.archive.org/web/20110927145056/http://www.sanmarcosrecord.com/local/x1169223054/Tearful-journey
- http://www.huffingtonpost.com/taryn-davis/american-widow-project-6_b_127424.html
- https://web.archive.org/web/20110723003325/http://www.afneurope.net/Home/ArticleDisplayDD/tabid/649/aid/7879/Default.aspx
- http://www.forthoodsentinel.com/story.php?id=626
- https://web.archive.org/web/20100304064331/http://www.humyo.com/F/9318175-1961825229
- G., Jessica (November 11, 2008). "American Widow Project Helps Military Wives Work Through Grief". Jezebel. Archived from the original on June 5, 2011.
- http://www.lemondrop.com/2008/11/11/young-iraq-widows-project-helps-others-grieve?icid=sphere_wpcom_inline
- https://web.archive.org/web/20090805232002/http://www.blogtalkradio.com/youserved/2009/07/16/Episode-20
- http://soldiersangelsforum.com/newsletters/1009.pdf
- http://www.intheirboots.org/episodes/season-1/we-regret-to-inform-you.html
- http://www.womenofworth.com/honorees/Honorees_2010.aspx
- https://web.archive.org/web/20110203065844/http://inside.dvf.com/awards/
