= Emily Reed =

Emily Reed may refer to:

- Emily Reed, a comic book character, see Dynamo 5#Supporting characters
- Emily Reed (ship), a Down Easter owned by a company in San Francisco
- Emily Wheelock Reed (1910–2000), librarian and civil rights activist

== See also ==
- Emilie Reid, British actress
