= U.S. Customhouse and Post Office (Waldoboro, Maine) =

- U.S. National Register of Historic Places
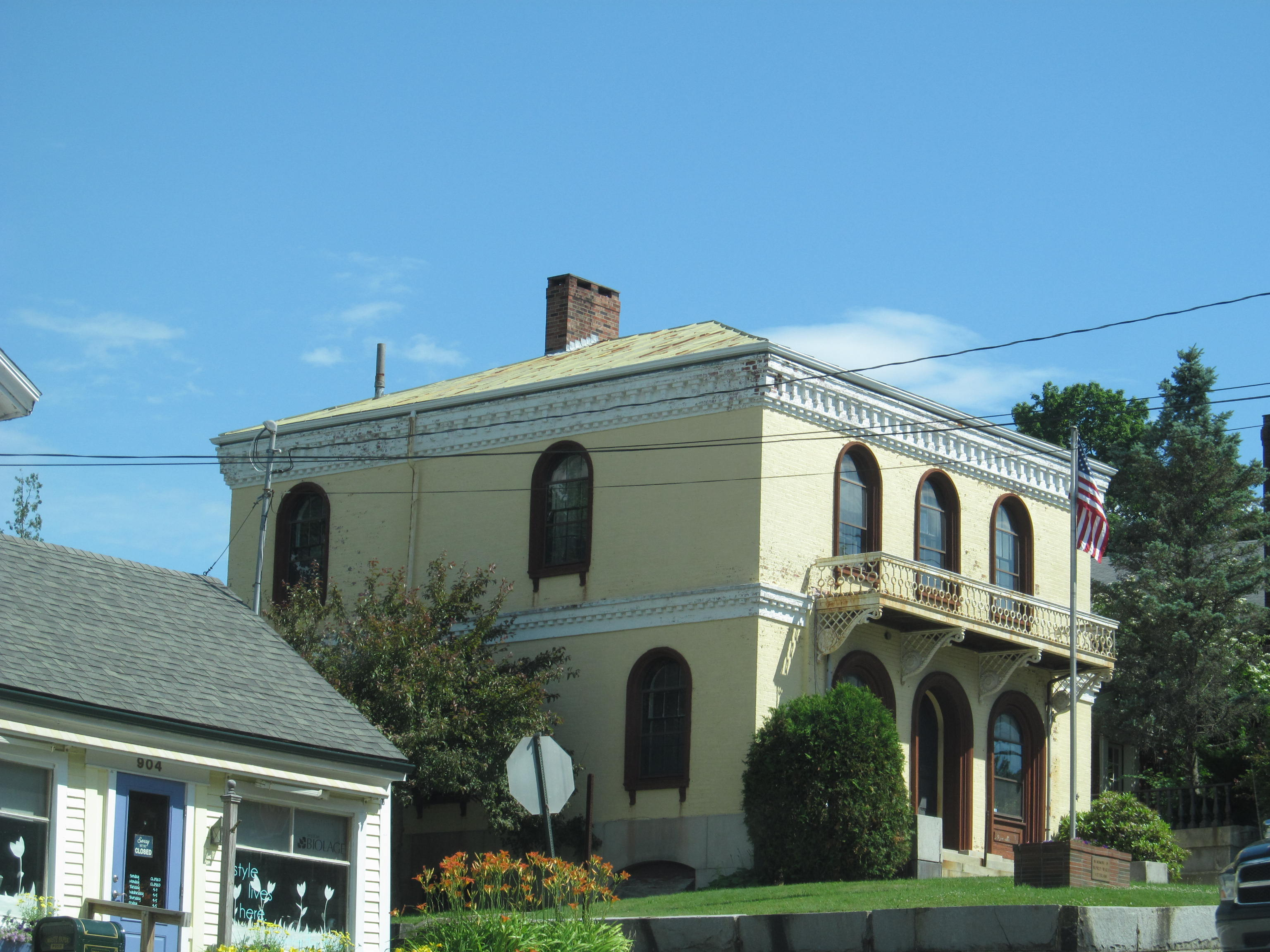

- Location within Maine Location within the United States
- Location: Main St., Waldoboro, Maine
- Coordinates: 44.0957°N 69.3753°W
- Area: 1 acre (0.40 ha)
- Built: 1855
- Architect: Ammi B. Young
- Architectural style: Italianate
- NRHP reference No.: 74000180
- Added to NRHP: January 18, 1974

The U.S. Customhouse and Post Office is a historic federal government building in Waldoboro, Maine. Built 1855–57, it is a fine local example of civic Italianate architecture. For much of the 20th century it housed the Waldoboro Public Library. It was listed on the National Register of Historic Places in 1974.

== Description and history ==
The former Waldoboro Customhouse stands in downtown Waldoboro, on the north side of Main Street just west of the Waldo Theatre. It is a two-story brick building, with a hip roof and painted brick exterior. Its exterior is distinguished by the large round-arch openings housing the windows and doors, the metal balcony spanning much of the front facade, and the elaborate cornice.

The Waldoboro customs district was established in 1799 and abolished in 1913, and encompassed ports in both Knox and Lincoln counties. Its original customhouse was a wood-frame structure, which was destroyed by fire in 1854. This building, its replacement, was built in 1855-57 to a design by Ammi B. Young the Supervising Architect of the United States Treasury Department. It is one of Young's smaller designs, but highlights his emphasis on Italianate styling and the use of fire-resistant materials throughout. After the customs district was abolished, the building was adapted for use by the Waldoboro Public Library, in which role it served when the building was listed on the National Register in 1974. The library has since moved to new quarters elsewhere on Main Street. The old customhouse is now a private residence.

== See also ==
- National Register of Historic Places listings in Lincoln County, Maine
- List of United States post offices
