= Abner I. Benyon =

American merchant ship (1875–1878)

- Abner I. Benyon docked in San Francisco sometime before 1885

History

United States
- Name: Abner I. Benyon; Alfred Watts
- Owner: 1874–1884: Samuel Watts; 1884–1887: Snow & Burgess
- Builder: Samuel Watts, Thomaston, Maine
- Launched: September 1874
- Home port: Searsport, Maine
- Fate: Capsized, 18 October 1887

General characteristics
- Displacement: 1,955 tons
- Length: 227 feet (69 m)
- Beam: 42 feet (13 m)
- Draft: 28 feet (8.5 m)

Abner I. Benyon was an American Down Easter launched in 1874. She spent a decade traveling between the Pacific and Europe until she was sold in 1884 and renamed Alfred Watts. In October 1887, she capsized in a hurricane while in the Atlantic. All 27 onboard were washed overboard, and 25 died while in the water due to various causes. Two crew members survived, made their way back to the partially sunken vessel, and were rescued a month later.

Oil painting of Abner I. Benyon
- https://catalogs.marinersmuseum.org/object/CL8713

== History ==
Abner I. Benyon was a three-deck ship built by Samuel Watts at Thomaston, Maine, for his own account and was launched in September 1874. She was named after the president of a bank in Boston with which many Maine shipowners had dealings. The ship was 227 feet (69 m) long, 42 feet (13 m) wide, by 28 feet (8.5 m) feet deep, and featured a registered displacement of 1,955 tons. Her first master was Captain Edward Brown Watts, the son of Samuel's brother and business partner Alfred Watts. The ship then went on a round-the-world voyage which lasted two years. She then operated on a route between New York, San Francisco, and the United Kingdom.

She was described as a slow ship but good at carrying cargo. Her five outward passages were relatively slow due to poor weather, with the fastest lasting 137 days. During one voyage, she lost a rudder and anchored at Port Stanley for three months. On the eastbound voyage between San Francisco and Europe, she was faster and averaged 127 days, with the fastest lasting 110 days. On the last such voyage, she sprung a leak and stopped at St. Thomas so it could be patched by a diver.

In 1883, the ship's namesake fled to Canada before a warrant for his arrest could be issued after he faced a warrant for embezzling and defrauding the Pacific National Bank. Samuel Watts felt betrayed by Benyon, and as a result, renamed the ship Alfred Watts to honor his brother.

In February 1884, the ship was sold to Snow & Burgess of New York and made two round voyages; the second was between New York, Hong Kong, San Francisco, Le Havre, and Philadelphia. On 8 October 1887, the Alfred Watts left Philadelphia under command of Captain Frank Johnson, with approximately 71,000 cases of kerosene onboard bound for Hiogo. The next day, she ran aground on the Bulkhead Shoal but was undamaged and soon freed. Once underway, she left the Delaware Bay on 11 October. She was drawing 26 feet (7.9 m), her cargo was well stowed and she had sufficient ballast to keep her in trim. Seven days later, she encountered a hurricane, and heeled so heavily that vertical parts of her hull made contact with the water before the ship capsized. The ship was still afloat, but the motion knocked off the main hatch. Everyone onboard—26 crewmembers and a passenger—attempted to cover the hatch with tarpaulins before they were washed overboard. Only four seamen and the passenger avoided drowning as they reached a portion of the deck house that drifted nearby. The next day, the passenger was washed off and drowned. Two sailors attempted to swim to the ship but were not seen again. Due to the presence of blood, it was assumed they were attacked by sharks. The two survivors—Harry Magnus and Oscar Linn—came along the ship after using broken spars as paddles 36 hours after they were washed off. In another account, Captain Johnson was a sixth man who reached the deckhouse, but was also washed away.

The two survivors then managed to successfully reach the ship where only the masts were exposed. The men perched themselves on the forward-most topgallant where they lived off of tanks of fresh water and salt pork, codfish, and other foods that floated out of the holds. They remained until 20 November, when they were sighted by the bark Lizzie Perry, headed for the West Indies. A boat from the bark rescued the two men. Lizzie Perry was wrecked off Barbados on 10 December, but everyone onboard was evacuated and survived. The men from Alfred Watts returned to Philadelphia in February 1888.
