= Governor Ames (disambiguation) =

Governor Ames is a wooden sailing ship. Governor Ames may also refer to:

Governor Ames may also refer to:

- Adelbert Ames (1835–1933), 27th and 30th Governor of Mississippi
- Benjamin Ames (1778–1835), 3rd Governor of Maine
- Oliver Ames (governor) (1831–1895), 35th Governor of Massachusetts
