= Mandia (surname) =

Mandia is a surname. Notable people with the surname include:

- Chris Mandia, American veteran, playwright, screenwriter, and film director
- Claudia Mandia (born 1992), Italian archer
- Ledina Mandia (born 1974), Albanian politician
- Scott Mandia, American academic
