= Benjamin Godfrey =

American merchant (1794–1862)

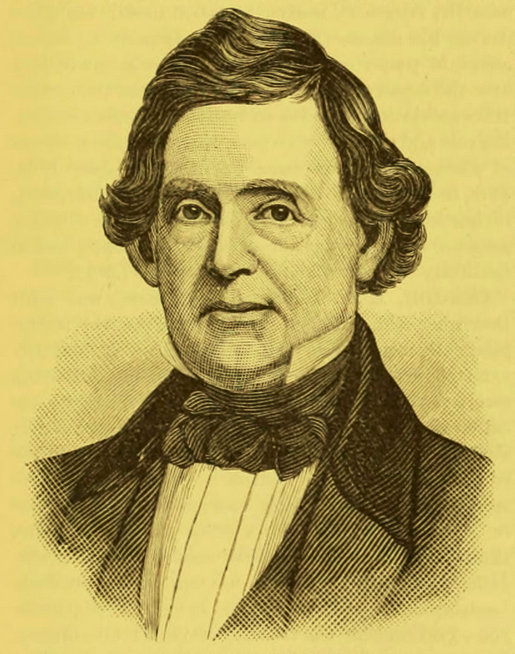

signature

Benjamin Godfrey (December 4, 1794 – August 13, 1862) was an American merchant and philanthropist from Massachusetts who is known for his work in the Illinois region. Running away to Ireland at a young age, Godfrey worked on ships in his early life, eventually commanding his own. This vessel was wrecked off the coast of Mexico, but Godfrey found wealth in a trading house in Matamoros, Tamaulipas. However, he was robbed and returned to the U.S. penniless.

He moved to Alton, Illinois, where he co-founded a successful complex of groceries in the region with Winthrop Sargent Gilman. Godfrey became involved with the Presbytery and established Monticello Seminary for women, now known as Lewis and Clark Community College. He is the namesake of Godfrey, Illinois, where the college is located, and the Benjamin Godfrey Memorial Chapel found there.

== Early life and education ==
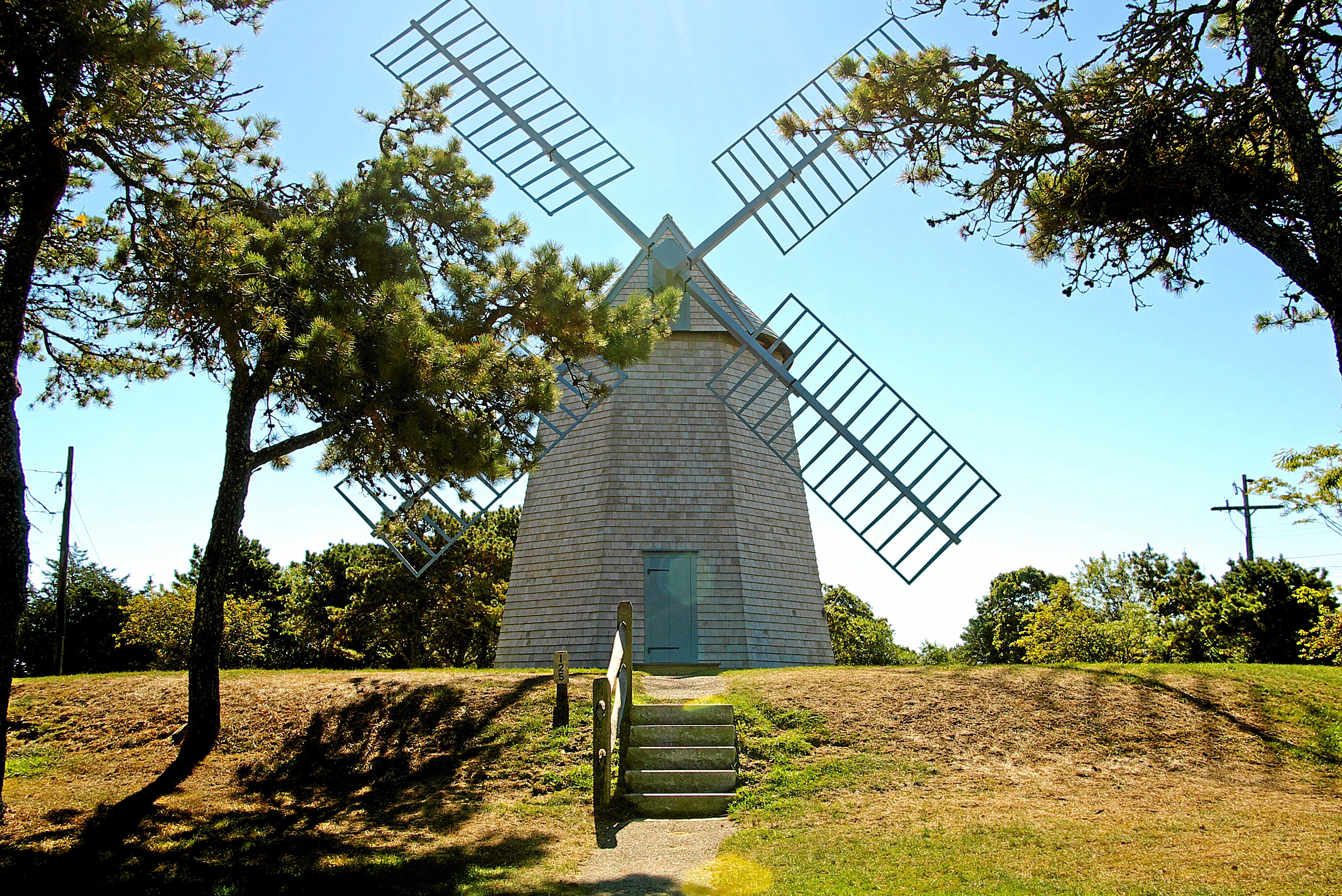
The Chatham Windmill, built in 1797 by the uncle of Benjamin Godfrey

Benjamin Godfrey was born in Chatham, Massachusetts, on December 4, 1794. When he was nine, he ran away from home and took a boat to Ireland. He spent the next nine years there, most likely working on ships.

== Career ==
The War of 1812 inspired Godfrey to return to the United States. He settled with an uncle, who gave him a basic education and helped him study navigation. He served with the United States Navy at some point during the war.

Following the conflict, Godfrey worked on a merchant ship. Godfrey later commanded his own ship, establishing trading routes from Baltimore, Maryland to New Orleans, Louisiana and the West Indies.

In the 1820s, Godfrey's ship was wrecked near Brazos Santiago, Mexico. In 1826, he opened a shop in Matamoros, Tamaulipas. The venture was very successful and he became a wealthy man, but most of his fortune was stolen as it was being transported out the country. He returned to the US, settling in New Orleans, where he worked until 1832.

He moved north, settling in Alton, Illinois, near St. Louis, Missouri, a gateway to the West. He soon established a successful partnership with Winthrop Sargent Gilman as Godfrey & Gilman. They operated groceries and related businesses in the region. In the fall of 1837, Gilman, a supporter of abolition, agreed to allow editor Elijah Parish Lovejoy to hide a newly acquired press for his newspaper Alton Observer, and abolitionist materials in the warehouse of Godfrey & Gilman in Alton. On November 7, the warehouse was attacked by a pro-slavery mob. Lovejoy was fatally shot in the confrontation, a man named Bishop in the mob also was killed, and the warehouse was burned to the ground. The incident generated national outrage, and Lovejoy became a martyr to abolition and a free press.

Godfrey had become closely associated with the local Presbyterian church, building a stone church for them in 1833. He was named a church elder on June 5, 1840.

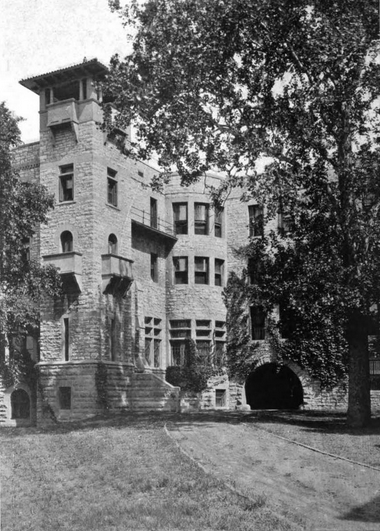
Monticello Seminary

Godfrey erected a seminary for women, using $53,000 of his own money. On April 11, 1838, the Monticello Seminary opened. This was an era of expansion of education for girls and women. After the seminary closed, its buildings were acquired and became part of Lewis and Clark Community College.

Godfrey purchased large tracts of land for his own use, eventually accumulating over 4,000 acres (1,600 ha). Godfrey turned his business attention to the railroads and worked as a contractor for the Alton & Sangamon Railroad. But, Godfrey struggled to manage his holdings and lost most of his wealth in the ensuing years.

== Personal life ==
Godfrey married Harriet Cooper on November 27, 1817; they had twelve children together. After Harriet's death, he remarried, on August 15, 1839, to R. E. Petit; they had three children. Ten of his children survived to adulthood. Godfrey died on August 13, 1862, and was buried in Godfrey Cemetery. His daughter, Catherine, married state representative John Mills Pearson.

== Legacy ==
- Godfrey, Illinois, was named his honor.
- The Monticello Female Seminary, which he founded, named its 1854 church in his honor as the Benjamin Godfrey Memorial Chapel.
- In 2017 Godfrey city leaders began establishing an urban trail, the Benjamin Godfrey Legacy Trail, to create a municipal heritage experience in honor of Godfrey. Ten historic plaques have been designated to mark significant sites along the legacy trail.
