= Carlotta Archer =

Native American teacher (1865–1946)

- Archer, circa 1930
- Born: Carlotta Archer; October 10, 1865; Cave Spring, Saline District, Cherokee Nation, Indian Territory
- Died: August 27, 1946 (aged 80); Pryor, Oklahoma
- Occupations: Teacher, Cherokee school board member, county school superintendent, federal civil servant
- Years active: 1883–1945

Carlotta Archer (October 10, 1865 – August 27, 1946) was a Native American teacher, musician, and civil servant. She was the only woman to ever serve on the original Cherokee Nation Board of Education. She then served as the Mayes County Superintendent of Schools from 1908 to 1927, before accepting a federal post in the Bureau of Indian Affairs and serving at the Muskogee and Pryor agencies as deputy field clerk until 1941. After her retirement from civil service, she worked as a librarian and executive secretary of the Red Cross. She was one of the first women to hold elective office in the state of Oklahoma.

== Early life and education ==
Carlotta Archer was born on October 10, 1865, in Cave Spring, near Locust Grove, Saline District, Cherokee Nation, Indian Territory, to Mary Frances "Polly" (née Vann) and Edwin F. Archer. Her mother was born in the Cherokee Country in Georgia and removed with her parents Joseph and Catherine (née Rowe) Vann to the Indian Territory in 1824 prior to the Trail of Tears. Joseph Vann held numerous offices in the Cherokee government including Senator, associate justice of the Cherokee Supreme Court, and Assistant Chief of the Cherokee Nation. Her father Edwin was a printer from New York City, of Irish heritage, who came to Indian Territory as a teacher in 1844. The following year, he married Polly and began working at the Park Hill Mission press. He printed "thousands of books", with titles in the Cherokee, Choctaw, Muscogee, and Wea languages. The press closed in 1861, and in 1871, he became the postmaster of the Pryor's Creek post office. The family moved to Pryor's Creek, also called Choteau (later Chouteau) which was about 9 miles south of Pryor. Carlotta was the youngest of five daughters, and was a talented musician. Her older sisters were Mary Elizabeth, Louisa Catherine, Ada, and Cora. The sisters were 1/16th Cherokee and Carlotta would later be enrolled as #26423 on the Dawes Rolls. She attended the First Cherokee Female Seminary and graduated in 1883.

== Career ==
=== Teaching (1884–1902) ===
Archer first worked at a rural school to earn money to attend Monticello Seminary in Godfrey, Illinois in 1891. After returning to Indian Territory, she taught music in Muskogee, at Alice Robinson Presbyterian Mission School, later Henry Kendall College, and now the University of Tulsa. Her father died in 1893. The following year, she was hired as the music teacher at the Cherokee Female Seminary. She remained at the female seminary until the end of the 1902 term.

=== School board (1905–1908) ===
In November 1905, Archer was appointed by Principal Chief William C. Rogers to serve on the Cherokee Nation's Board of Education. Her appointment became embroiled in the divisions among the leadership of the Cherokee Council. As part of the preparations for uniting Indian and Oklahoma Territories into the State of Oklahoma, the tribal government was to be abolished in March 1906. Chief Rogers did not call an election in 1905 because he saw no reason to incur the expense of a vote, since the government was terminating. Tribal members who opposed Rogers, held an election, impeached Rogers, and appointed Frank J. Boudinot as chief. Boudinot appointed Sam F. Parks to remain on the board of education, leaving no vacancy for Archer to fill. At the time, Rogers was in Washington, D.C. and the assistant chief, David McNair Faulkner refused to recognize the actions of the council which was not elected according to Cherokee law. Faulkner's communication to the individuals and not the body which claimed to be duly elected, stated that unless compelled to by the court, he would not turn over any of the records to them. In anticipation of the termination of the tribe, the Cherokee Courts had been abolished, and neither the inspector or agent at the local agency wanted to be involved in the dispute, which meant that the Interior Department would have to resolve the matter.

When Archer went to Tahlequah to take up her post, she was informed by Parks that he would not be vacating his office. She returned to manage her farm at Pryor Creek and await the decision of the Department of the Interior. Their decision was handed down in March 1906, with the department refusing to recognize Boudinot as chief or Parks as a member of the school board. With her appointment confirmed, Archer became the first woman to hold a position on the Cherokee Education Board. The three members of the board were responsible for hiring all of the teachers who taught at the 200 schools in the nation. At the Oklahoma Constitutional Convention held in November, women's suffrage was debated, but not passed; however, women were allowed under the constitution adopted for statehood in 1907 to hold county offices and vote in school board elections. On February 1, 1908, the Secretary of the Interior dissolved the seventy-five year old Cherokee School System and its board. With that action, Archer became the only woman to have ever served on the Cherokee Board of Education.

=== Civil servant (1908–1941) ===
In July 1908, Archer was appointed as deputy superintendent of schools for Mayes County, Oklahoma. Evan Dhu Cameron, the State Superintendent of Schools, claimed that Archer was not legally chosen to serve as the acting superintendent of schools when the elected superintendent N. C. Hunt resigned. Cameron stated that Hunt had been charged with irregularities and left the state. Before his resignation could be acted upon, Hunt returned and appointed Archer as the deputy superintendent and left the state again. Cameron alleged that the county commissioners should not have allowed Hunt to appoint a successor. In September, the county commissioners met and approved Archer to serve as the acting superintendent until an election could be held. Attorney General Charles West refused to get involved in the dispute and Archer continued with her duties. She won the office in the 1910 and 1912 elections, and then retired in 1915, to go to work at the Five Civilized Tribes Agency in Muskogee. Encouraged by friends to run again for county school superintendent, Archer won re-election in 1916, 1918, 1920, 1922, 1924, and 1926, serving a total of 19 years as county school superintendent.

After completing her last term in 1927, Archer was appointed as a junior clerk in the Five Civilized Tribes Agency in Pryor. She also served as assistant to the field agent, Fred O. Rogers, who had responsibility over schools and conducted investigations and surveys to analyze the social and economic conditions of the Native people under their care. The field agents were responsible for collecting data and making reports on education, employment, and health. Archer collected information about families, including where they lived, what lands they owned, and what assistance they might need. By 1940, Archer was a clerk in both in the Pryor office and at the Muskogee agency, where she worked in the leasing division. She retired from the agency in March 1941.

=== Final years (1941–1946) ===
Archer was not idle in her retirement. In November 1941, she volunteered as the acting secretary for the Chamber of Commerce while they searched for a permanent employee. She became the executive secretary of the local branch of the Red Cross in January 1942. During World War II, the chapter doubled their expected quota to the war fund in 1943, and Archer served as interim librarian at the Pryor Public Library when the regular librarian resigned. She continued her work with both the Red Cross and as a librarian through 1945, and served on the Board of Directors of the Pryor Public Library until her final illness.

== Death and legacy ==
Archer became ill in January 1946 and was hospitalized several times. She died on August 27, 1946, at the Whitaker Hospital in Pryor, Oklahoma, after several months of illness. She was buried in the Pryor Cemetery the following day. In 1948, her niece Vera Jones, donated Archer's 354 volume library to the Pryor Public Library. Archer is remembered as one of the first women in Oklahoma to be elected to public office. When she was elected in 1910, there were only 17 women who had won the office of county school superintendent, Kate Barnard Oklahoma Commissioner of Charities and Corrections was the only statewide office holder, and four women had run for county registrar of deeds.
