= Tristan Dyer =

American film director

Tristan Dyer is an American film director, stop-motion animator, and Iraq war veteran from Waldoboro, Maine. He served in the U.S. Army for five years and spent one year at Camp Taji, Iraq with an Air Cavalry unit. After being honorably discharged from the Army in 2005, Dyer attended the Brooks Institute of Photography in Ventura, California where he earned a BA in Visual Journalism.

Dyer's film, "The Other Way Out", won the 2009 Best Animation award at New England Film.com film festival and, that same year, the film won an Alliance for Community Media award for best non-professional animation. A year later, he was awarded a fellowship with Operation In Their Boots, a production of Brave New Foundation, to make a film about Iraq/Afghanistan Veterans and substance abuse. CNN listed Dyer on their July 5, 2010 Intriguing People list.

== The Other Way Out ==
"The Other Way Out" is the story of how one woman escaped a 15-year addiction to opiates. Narrated by herself, she recalls the experience of her addiction and the use of a controversial method of recovery called Ibogaine, which is illegal in the United States. Her tale is illustrated through stop-motion animation and time-lapse photography.

== Enduring Erebus ==
"Enduring Erebus" uses stop-motion animation to delve into the psyche of abuse and recovery in U.S. combat veterans who served in Iraq and Afghanistan. Veterans whose self-medication with drugs and alcohol has spiraled out of control narrate the film.

Enduring Erebus premiered on November 9, 2010, at the Downtown Independent in Los Angeles, California along with the four other Operation In Their Boots documentaries. All five films are currently online.

== Personal life ==
Tristan currently lives in Ventura, CA with his wife, Ineke.
