= John Mills Pearson =

American politician

Member of the Illinois House of Representatives from the 41st district
- In office 1878 – 1884

Personal details
- Born: October 7, 1832 Newburyport, Massachusetts
- Died: June 4, 1910 (aged 77) Godfrey, Illinois
- Party: Republican
- Profession: Merchant

John Mills Pearson (October 7, 1832 – June 4, 1910) was an American politician and Mason from Massachusetts. Although originally intending to study at Harvard University, Pearson instead moved to Illinois and became a merchant. He was named a trustee of the University of Illinois in 1870, then served on the Illinois Board of Railroad and Warehouse Commissioners from 1873 to 1877. Pearson was elected to the Illinois House of Representatives in 1878, where he served three terms. Pearson was also a leader in the Illinois Grand Lodge, rising to become its Grand Master.

== Biography ==
John Mills Pearson was born in Newburyport, Massachusetts, on October 7, 1832. He attended preparatory school at the Putnam Free School. Pearson originally intended to study civil engineering at Harvard University, but instead moved in 1847 to Alton, Illinois. There, he was hired as an engineer on the Alton & Sangamon Railroad. However, he disliked the position and instead took a position as a clerk with the Handon Agricultural Works. Pearson worked his way up to a partnership with the firm. He retired in 1865 shortly after the death of another partner. In 1886, Pearson purchased a farm in Godfrey, Illinois, where he would live for the rest of his life.

Pearson became a local leader in the Republican Party upon its founding in the 1850s. In 1873, he was appointed to the state Board of Railroad and Warehouse Commissioners. He served two two-year terms. In 1878, Pearson was elected to the Illinois House of Representatives and would serve three consecutive three-year terms. Godfrey first joined a Masonic order in 1853. He rose to become Grand Master of the Grand Lodge of Illinois. At other times, he served as the Grand High Priest, Grand Thrice Illustrious, and Grand Commander of the Knights Templar. He served on the committee of jurisprudence on the national Grand Lodge.

Pearson married Catherine Godfrey, the daughter of Benjamin Godfrey, in 1855. They had three surviving children: Arthur Godfrey, John Longfellow, and Eleanor. Pearson was originally a Presbyterian, but later identified with the Congregational church. He was active in its Sunday School and occasionally preached when the regular pastor could not. Pearson served as a trustee of the University of Illinois in 1870, serving until 1873. He died at his home in Godfrey on June 4, 1910. He had been ill for two years.
