= Ben Schlanger =

American architect

Benjamin Schlanger (died May 3, 1971) was an American theater architect. Some of the theaters he designed include: the Jewel Theater at 711 Kings Highway, Brooklyn, City Cinemas I-II, the Vistavision Todd-AO Patriot Theaters at Colonial Williamsburg, Grade Arts Center, the Leonard Nimoy Thalia Theater, at Symphony Space and the Waldo Theatre. He received a Certificate of Merit from the Municipal Art Society with co-designer Abraham W. Geller for Cinema I-II. He also played a key design role in: the United Nations General Assembly Building and the Metropolitan Opera House in the Lincoln Center for the Performing Arts as well as the Place des Arts, the Sydney Opera House and the John F. Kennedy Center. He chaired the Committee on Auditorium and Theater Architecture of the American Institute of Architects and was a trustee of the National Institute of Architectural Education. In addition, he was a contributor to The Architectural Forum and The Architectural Record and in 1964 was the recipient of the Albert S. Bard architectural award.

Schlanger was born in New York and attended Columbia University and the National Institute for Architectural Education. He died in French Hospital on May 3, 1971, aged 66.
