= Selected Shorts =

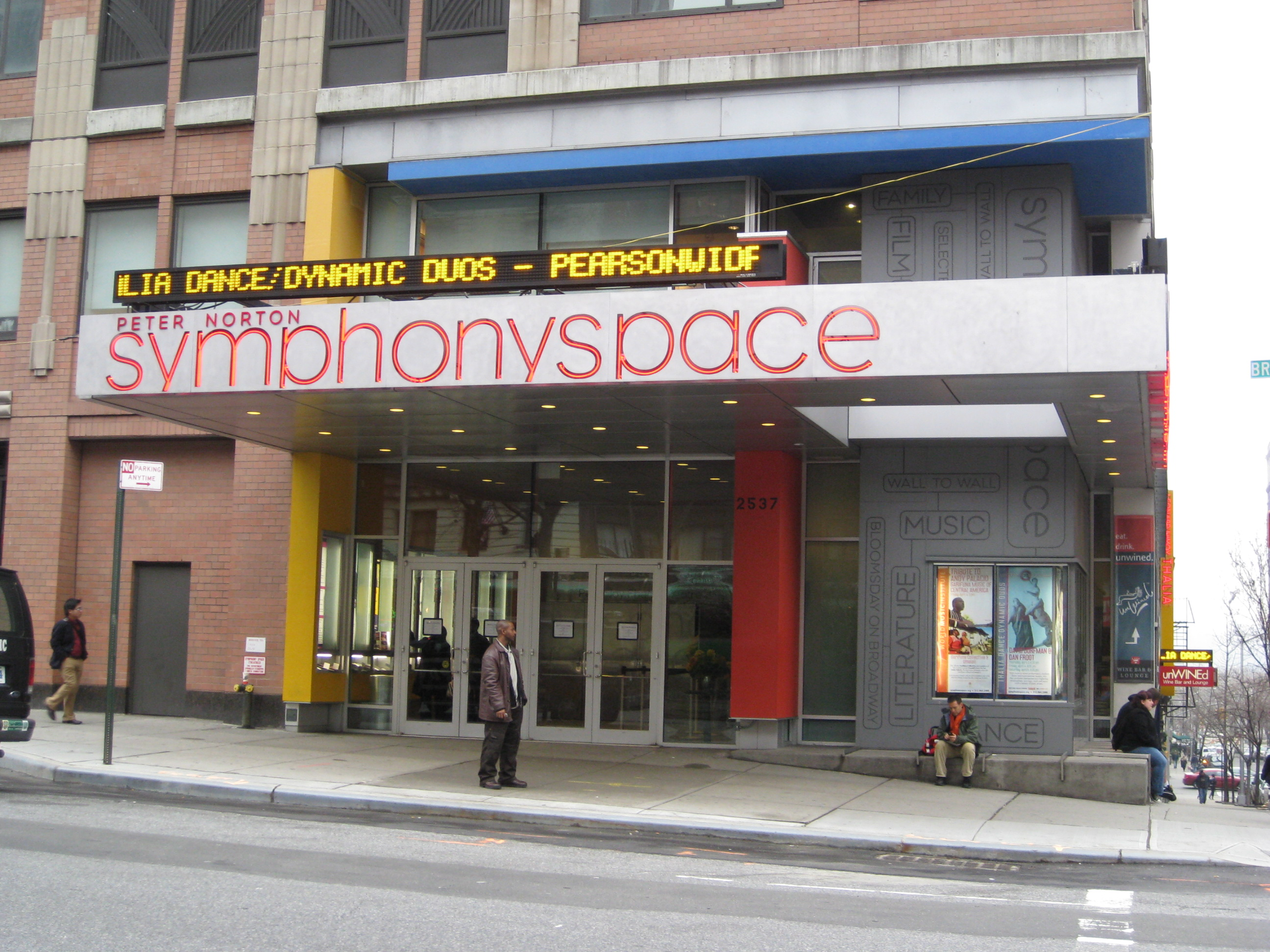
- Running time: 1 hour
- Language: English
- Home station: WNYC
- Hosted by: Public Radio International
- Created by: Kay Cattarulla
- Directed by: Isaiah Sheffer

Selected Shorts is an event at New York's Symphony Space on the Upper West Side, in which screen and stage actors read classic and new short fiction before a live audience. The stage show began in 1985 and continues today at Symphony Space's Peter Jay Sharp Theater.

The annual season of the live events at Symphony Space begins in the mid-fall and ends in mid-spring. There is a theme to each Selected Shorts episode and performance. Several stories are presented around each theme. The stories are always fiction, sometimes classic, sometimes new, always performed by actors from stage, screen and television who bring these short stories to life. Evenings are often co-hosted by writers, literary producers, and other interesting characters.

Selected Shorts was originally created by Kay Cattarulla, who in 1995 went on to create another successful literary program in Dallas, Arts & Letters Live, which is sponsored by the Dallas Museum of Art.

Symphony Space's Artistic Director Isaiah Sheffer formerly hosted the live events, although many Selected Shorts also feature guest hosts, often well-known writers, who also choose which stories will be read. Mr. Sheffer died on November 9, 2012, at age 76. Actor BD Wong has acted as the host of the live events since the fall of 2012.

The readings are recorded live and become the basis of a one-hour radio program, hosted by actors, authors, and entertainers such as David Sedaris, Stephen Colbert, Cynthia Nixon, Wyatt Cenac, Jane Kaczmarek, and Meg Wolitzer, with literary commentator Hannah Tinti of One Story Magazine, and are produced in conjunction with WNYC. The programs are distributed by Public Radio International and air on PRI-affiliated public radio stations in the United States. The radio program airs weekly throughout the year.

Originally, the program was distributed by National Public Radio. However, in October 2007, it moved its distribution to PRI, Public Radio International.

The program's theme is David Peterson's "That's the Deal," performed by the Deardorf/Peterson group. Until 2011, the radio show began and ended with the piano and cello duet "Come to the Meadow" by Roger Kellaway.
