= Murder of Douglas J. Parent =

American unsolved murder

Douglas J Parent
- Born: March 24, 1919; Waterville, Maine
- Died: October 3, 1983 (aged 64); Waldoboro, Maine
- Cause of death: Murder by strangulation
- Other name: DJ
- Occupation: Newsstand owner

Douglas J. Parent (March 24, 1919 – October 3, 1983) was the owner of the Waldoboro Newsstand in Waldoboro, Maine. His body was discovered in his apartment above the store on October 3, 1983. At the time of his death, there was confusion as to whether Parent had been killed or died by accident due to a fall. It was finally determined that Parent had been murdered; death by strangulation. The Maine Unsolved Homicide Unit lists Parent’s death as one of 70 unsolved murders it is still currently investigating in the State.

== Background ==
Douglas J. Parent, born in Waterville, Maine, March 24, 1919, After graduating High School, he worked for the Great Atlantic & Pacific Tea Company, better known as the A&P. Drafted into the US Army in 1936, Parent said it was the best time of his life. "The major turning point in my life," Parent recalled, "was being drafted into the United States Army. If it hadn’t been for Pearl Harbor in 1941, I never would have been outside the State of Maine. I still would have been a hick from the sticks." After his service, Parent returned to the A&P and then went to work for twenty-two years in the installment loan department with the Depositors Trust Company. According to the book, Profiles of Maine by Lynn Franklin, Parent was a "pillar in the Waldoboro community; active in the American Field Service, Chamber of Commerce Merchants Association, Boys and Girls Scouts, President of the local Lions Club, and hosted exchange students." In 1967, Parent purchased Ludwig's Newsstand in Waldoboro, Maine from Margie and Bill Freeman. He opened the Waldoboro Newsstand on May 1, 1967. Along with selling local, regional and national news publications, confectioneries and packaged beverages, the newsstand was a collection station for Central Maine Power, the area telephone company and the water utilities for local residents to pay their bills. The newsstand also served as a dry cleaning drop-off service; as well as a Greyhound bus agent. Parent lived in the apartment above the newsstand.

== Petrovitz interview ==
In April 1977, University of Maine student Richard Petrovitz interviewed Parent for COM 101 - Speaker / Audience communication coursework; documenting oral histories of Maine. In the interview, Parent expressed interest in writing a book about his time running a newsstand in a small town after he retired: "Let me tell you, it would be on the best-selling list. Ooh, there are a lot of things that I would like to tell about; but we don’t repeat everything."

Petrovitz asked Parent if there had been any recent crimes committed in the Waldoboro area; specifically murders. "What do you think about any of the crime around here? Were there any bad crimes that you can ever remember?" Petrovitz asked. "No," Parent replied, "There’s never been a major crime committed since I’ve been here." "No murders?" asked Petrovitz. Parent answered, "No, no. No murders. No murders in the town of Waldoboro."

Six years later, on October 3, 1983, Parent would be found dead as a result of homicide.

== Death and investigation ==
The Bangor Daily News reported that Parent went out to dinner at the Bonanza restaurant in Rockland, Maine on Sunday, October 2, 1983. Parent’s business associate, Jackie Tate, opened the newsstand the next morning, Monday, October 3, so he could sleep in. Tate called up to Parent in his apartment above the newsstand throughout the morning, but received no answer. Around 10:30AM, a frequent customer and local fisherman, Sidney Geyer, came into the store and asked for Parent. Attempting to locate him, Geyer found Parent dead in the apartment on his bedroom floor.

Unable to revive Parent, first responders initially ruled his death a heart attack due to age; he was 64. Attending physician, Ronald Roy, sent the body for an autopsy. The town of Waldoboro was shocked to hear the news of Parent’s death. Samuel C Pennington, publisher of Maine Antique Digest, said: "Parent was the most important man in Waldoboro. He held the town together."

When the autopsy report came back, the findings revealed Parent died of a fractured larynx. Although the cause of death was now determined to be that of asphyxiation, Sergeant Douglas Holmes of the Maine State Police did not rule it a homicide (strangulation). "The only way we will decide for sure," said Holmes, "is to arrest a perpetrator. It is a rarity to find a fractured larynx in a falling accident; but it has happened."

Townsfolk agreed that although Parent could be abrasive, he did not have any enemies. "He was a foul-mouthed but a sweet guy," said Pennington. "He was not shy … he did not suffer fools gladly." Parent was not one to leave his doors unlocked. Holmes stated there was "no evidence of forced entry into the apartment and no obvious sign of any struggle." Lifelong friend, Bob O’Brien, stated: "He [must have] let in whoever did it." Speculation began to point to a robbery; in particular: money. Bangor Daily News reporter, Emmet Meara, claimed that Parent would make several trips to the bank every day; sometimes up to half a dozen times. He did not want someone getting the idea about the newsstand having money on hand. Parent conveyed to author Lynn Franklin, "People seem to think that since I’ve been here I’ve amassed a small fortune. They say: 'Oh, gee, if I had your money, I wouldn’t be working.' If I had the money people thought I had, I wouldn’t have the goddamn doors open. I’d have them closed — boarded up." State police discovered there was nearly $1,000 USD unaccounted for in Parent's apartment following his death. This sum of money, however, was later located. Lieutenant Gene Pierce was quoted in March 1984, "We’re not classifying it as a homicide or an accident. We are still calling it a suspicious death; and the file is still very much open."

Shortly after the Maine State Police Unsolved Homicide Unit was formed in 2015, Parent's name was added to its unsolved homicide list; classifying his death a murder. According to the Dark Downeast Podcast, a new detail emerged along with this classification. Parent was last seen alive on 10.2.83 at approximately 8:45PM in his apartment. He presumably told a witness that he was going to meet a person at 9:00PM about money that was owed him.

Parent was found dead the next morning on Monday, October 3, 1983. He had just 10 weeks left before his planned retirement on January 1, 1984. His death was presumed to have occurred only a few hours before the discovery. Waldoboro chief of police, Melvin Spencer, said: "We are treating it as a suspicious death but not necessarily a homicide. His larynx could have been broken in a fall." Parent's main street apartment was found to be in a disrupted state. However, this could not confirm a struggle had occurred due to the fact that Parent was "chaotic in his personal habits."

Parent left the newsstand to Jackie Tate in his will.

== Legacy ==
- Dark Down East. Low, Kylie. New England True Crime Podcast. Kylie Media Production.
- Franklin, Lynn (1976). Profiles of Maine. Maine Antique Digest. ISBN 9780917312007.

== See also ==
- Lists of unsolved murders
- List of unsolved murders (1980–1999)
