= Operation In Their Boots =

American film fellowship

Operation In Their Boots (OITB) is a film fellowship launched by the In Their Boots division of Brave New Foundation. The OITB program, led by executive producer Richard Ray Perez, provided five Iraq and Afghanistan veterans with the opportunity to write, produce, and direct their own documentaries about veterans. The film fellowships were fully funded and each participant was provided with a budget to make their film, as well as a stipend for their work. In addition, they were supported by the professional production team at In Their Boots.

Tristan Dyer (U.S. Army, Iraq War veteran), Kyle Hartnett (U.S. Army Paratrooper, Afghanistan War veteran), Chris Mandia (U.S. Marine Corps, Iraq War veteran), Victor Manzano (U.S. Marine Corps, Iraq and Afghanistan Wars veteran), and Clint Van Winkle (U.S. Marine Corps, Iraq War veteran) were the combat veterans chosen to produce and direct films.

All five of the films premiered on November 9, 2010 at the Downtown Independent in Los Angeles, California and the documentaries are currently online.

Operation In Their Boots was funded by a grant from the Iraq Afghanistan Deployment Impact Fund (IADIF) of the California Community Foundation.

== Operation In Their Boots Films ==
=== Enduring Erebus ===
Tristan Dyer's documentary was shot using stop motion animation. It deals with substance abuse among veterans. Four U.S. veterans, three men and a woman, provide the narrative to his film.

=== No Religious Preference ===
Kyle Hartnett's documentary is about his personal quest to gain a better understanding of the challenges Muslim-American service members and veterans face. A majority of his documentary was filmed in Dearborn, Michigan, which has the largest population of Muslims in America. No Religious Preference also includes an interview with James Yee, a former U.S. Army chaplain accused of espionage by the U.S. Army.

=== The Academic Front ===
Chris Mandia’s documentary deals with the transition American service members make when they move from the battle field to a college campus.

=== The Way of the Warrior ===
Victor Manzano's film focuses on Rudy Reyes, a Recon Marine best known for his role in HBO's Generation Kill, and how Reyes overcame immense hurdles to become a highly skilled combat Marine, a successful actor, and an inspiring self-help author.

=== The Guilt ===
Clint Van Winkle's film focuses "on readjustment, highlighting the phenomenon known as 'survivor's guilt,' after his buddies lost a close friend in Iraq in 2005." The majority of the film was shot in Philadelphia, Pennsylvania.
