= Emily Gillmore Alden =

American author and educator

- Born: January 21, 1834; Boston, Massachusetts, U.S.
- Died: June 6, 1914 (aged 80); Boston
- Occupations: author; educator
- Partner: Harriet Newell Haskell
- Relatives: John Alden
- Writing career
- Pen name: E. G. A.
- Language: English

Signature
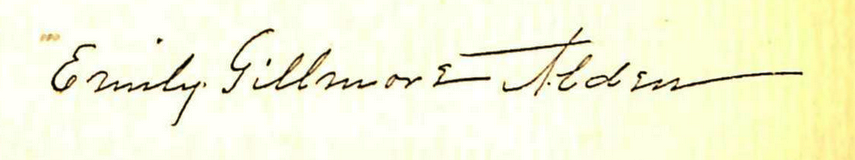

Emily Gillmore Alden (pen name, E. G. A.; January 21, 1834 – June 6, 1914) was an American author and educator. For forty years, Alden was a member of the faculty of Monticello Seminary, and for nearly fifty years, the poet of the school. Alden wrote the commencement day poems for Monticello every year since she entered the institution. Harriet Newell Haskell : a span of sunshine gold was published in 1908 and Poems by Emily Gillmore Alden was published in 1909.

== Early life and education ==
Emily Gillmore (or, "Gilmore") Alden was born in Boston, Massachusetts, January 21, 1834. On April 11, her mother, Emily (Gillmore) Alden, died. Her father, Joseph Warren Alden, remarried and Alden had three half siblings, Ann Frances, Joseph Henry, and James Birney. Alden was of Pilgrim ancestry, being a descendant of John Alden, a crew member of the Mayflower.

In infancy, before the mother's death, the family removed to Cambridge, Massachusetts and Alden's education was pursued in the public schools of that city, and in Mount Holyoke Female Seminary (now Mount Holyoke College), South Hadley, Massachusetts, (1855). While attending Mount Holyoke, Alden made the acquaintance of Harriet Newell Haskell, and the two became life-long companions.

== Career ==
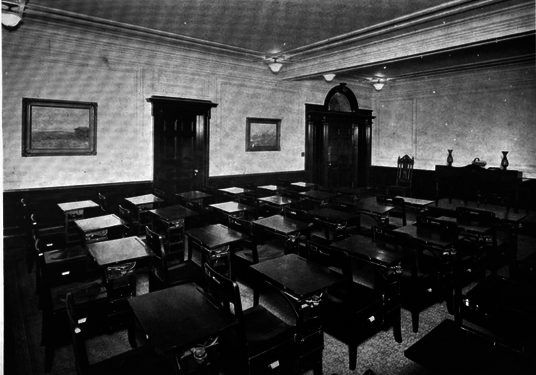
The Alden Senior Recitation Room at Monticello Seminary

Alden's career was chiefly that of a teacher, starting in Castleton, Vermont. She came with Haskell to Monticello Seminary, Godfrey, Illinois in 1868. In this latter institution, Alden had charge of the departments of history, rhetoric, and English literature, and of senior classes for graduation, as well as physiology, zoology and United States history. Alden was connected with Monticello Seminary till 1907, during the entire period that Haskell had charge of the institution.

Alden's literary work, stimulated probably by the scope of her teaching and her experience as an educator, was a recreation. Avoiding publicity, her first efforts were offered under a pen name. An early critic, detecting an artistic touch in her poetic fancy, insisted that she come forward, and thereafter, her poems were published under her own signature. One of her poems was read at the Parliament of the World's Religions in 1893. She published Haskell's biography in 1908. In 1909, the Monticello Alumnae associations of St. Louis, Chicago, New York, Kansas City, Missouri, Boston, and Springfield, Illinois decided to publish Alden's poems. The book contained the class poems that Alden wrote in over 35 years and the poems for the school.

== Death and legacy ==
Alden and Haskell shared a common home and finances for more than 50 years. After the latter's death, Alden removed to her sister-in-law's (Mrs. J. H. Alden) home in Boston and died there on June 6, 1914, at the age of 81.

In 1946, the new faculty residence at Monticello was named Alden House in her honor.

== Selected works ==
=== By E. G. A. ===
- Harriet Newell Haskell : a span of sunshine gold, 1908

=== By Emily Gillmore Alden ===
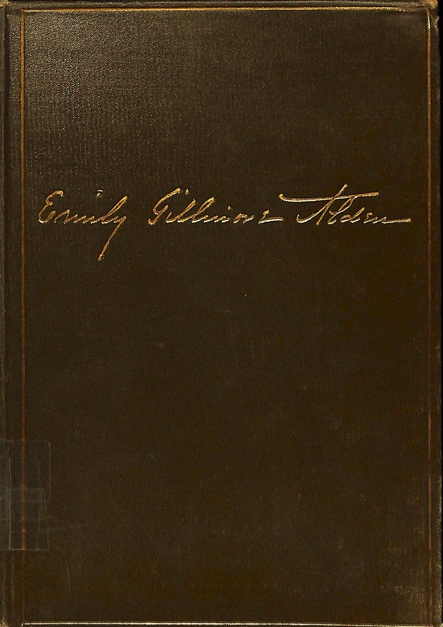
Poems by Emily Gillmore Alden

- Poems by Emily Gillmore Alden, 1909 (published by Melling & Gaskins)
- "Monticello Seminary", 1888 (poem)
