= Monticello Seminary =

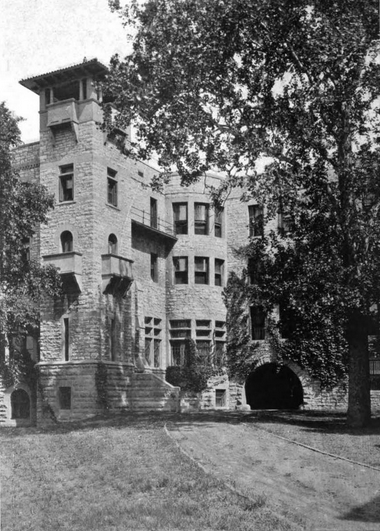
West Tower

Monticello Seminary (also Monticello Female Seminary), founded in 1835, was an American seminary, junior college and academy in Godfrey, Illinois. The 215 acres (87 ha) campus was the oldest female seminary in the west, before it closed in 1971. The buildings are now part of Lewis and Clark Community College.

== History ==
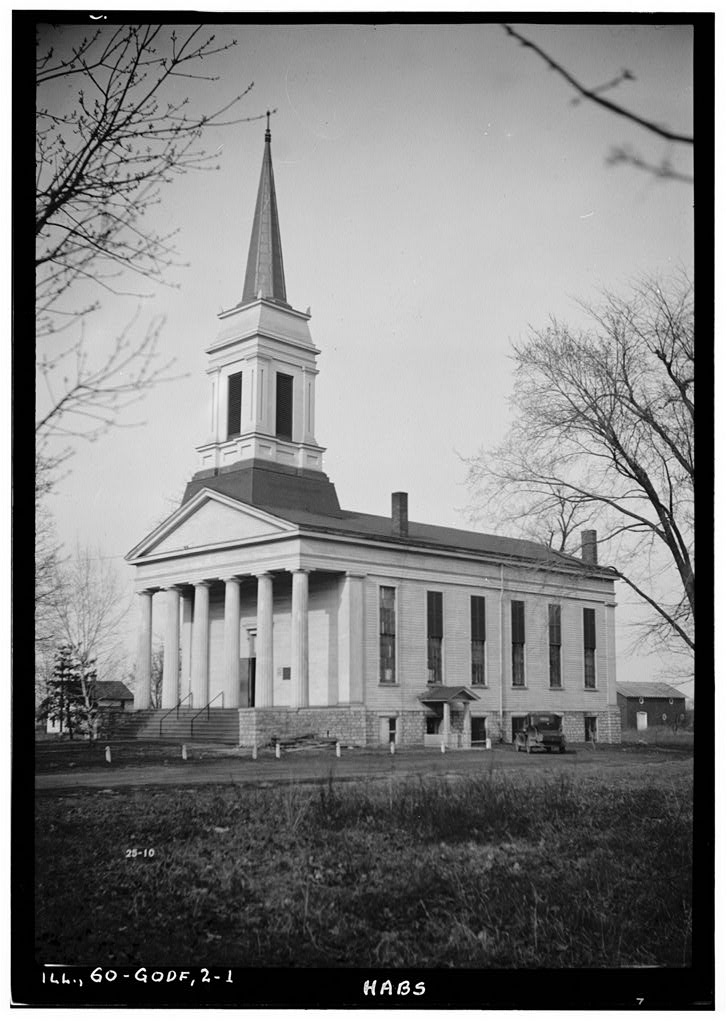
Benjamin Godfrey Memorial Chapel

The school was founded by Captain Benjamin Godfrey. He was an elder in the Presbyterian church of Alton, Illinois and interested in the cause of Christian education. Noting the predominating influence of the mother on the child, he saw that the higher education of women made them better trainers and teachers of their children. With this thought as the keynote of his reflections, he determined to erect a seminary to be devoted, as he phrased it, “to the moral, intellectual and domestic improvement of females."

He thereupon erected, at a cost of US$53,000, a spacious edifice in a beautiful grove on his lands at Godfrey, then known as Monticello, which he placed in charge of a self-perpetuating board of trustees. The original building was commenced February 20, 1835. The seminary was opened and classes organized April 11, 1838. A charter was granted by the state of Illinois to Monticello Female Seminary in 1840. The first class was graduated in June, 1841. The original buildings were destroyed by fire November 4, 1888. A temporary building was promptly erected and occupied from January, 1889, to June, 1890. The cornerstone of the new building was laid June 11, 1889, and building dedicated June 10, 1890.

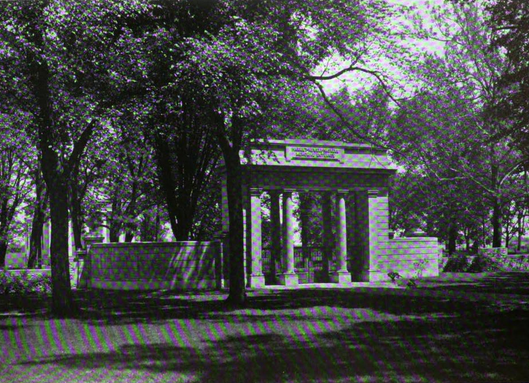
Haskell Memorial Entrance

The first head of the institution was Rev. Dr. Theron Baldwin, a native of Connecticut, and a graduate of Yale University. After five years of service, from 1838 to 1843, he was succeeded by Philena Fobes. She was succeeded in 1867 by Harriet Newell Haskell, a member of a distinguished New England family, and one of the remarkable women of her generation. She was the principal of Monticello for 40 years. Catherine Burrowes, of the faculty, succeeded Haskell from 1907 to 1910 as acting principal, declining permanent appointment. Martina C. Erickson, having been elected permanent principal, assumed her new duties from September 1910 to 1917. She was formerly dean of the ladies' department of the Indiana State Normal School. Other notable figures include Harriet Rice Congdon, principal from 1918 to 1935, and Dr. Gail Myers, president from 1966 to 1971.

== Architecture and fittings ==
The original building at Monticello was of stone, 110 by 44 feet (34 m × 13 m), with four stories including basement. A fifth story was added in 1854 and a south wing 45 by 70 feet (14 m × 21 m). When the buildings and equipment were destroyed by fire the property loss was $350,000. Designed by architect Theodore Link, the new buildings, far more spacious than the old, were constructed of Corydon, Bedford, and Alton stone. The building was heated by hot water, lighted by gas, wired for electricity, and provided with elevator service from basement to upper floor. The buildings were fireproof. The groves, lawns and spacious campus of Monticello were of unrivaled attractiveness. The “Haskell Memorial Entrance,” erected by former students in honor of the late principal, was an imposing and artistic portal and was flanked by a handsome wall extending across the front of the grounds and 700 feet (210 m) in length. The memorial was the first monument dedicated to a woman in the United States.

== Notable people ==
- Emily Gilmore Alden (1834–1914), educator at Monticello Seminary for 40 years
- Carrie Thomas Alexander-Bahrenberg, valedictorian, class of 1880
- Carlotta Archer, (1865–1946), class of 1891, only woman to ever serve on the original Cherokee Nation School Board
- Mary Leggett Cooke (1852-1938), Unitarian minister and member of the Iowa Sisterhood
- Carolyn T. Foreman, known then as Carolyn Thomas, later married Oklahoma lawyer and historian Grant Foreman. She became a notable historian in her own right.
- Lucy Larcom, teacher, poet, and writer
- Ruth Bryan Owen, U.S. Representative from Florida and Ambassador to Denmark
- Eliza M. Chandler White (1831-1907), charity work leader and clubwoman
