= Moody's Diner =

Diner in Waldoboro, Maine

Moody’s Diner

Restaurant information
- Established: 1927
- Owner: Moody Family
- Location: 1885 Atlantic Highway, Maine
- Seating capacity: 100+
- Website: https://moodysdiner.com/

Moody's Diner is a diner located in Waldoboro, Maine. It is one of the most well-known and most-written-about diners in the state since it first opened in 1927.

== History ==
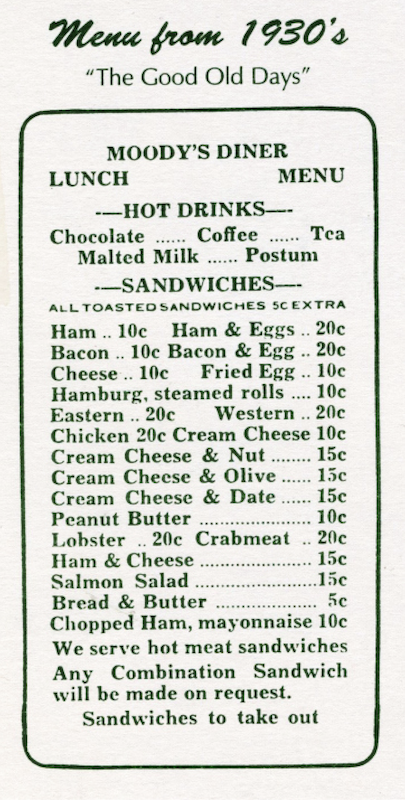
Moody's Diner Menu 1930

Moody's Diner began as a rest stop for travelers heading north on US Route 1 in Waldoboro, Maine by Percy and Bertha Moody just prior to the Great Depression; offering 3 small cabins for $1 a night. Percy and his wife Bertha added a small dining room (now known as Aunt Letta's House) for the locals and travelers in 1930; which turned into a modest lunch wagon that sold hotdogs and hamburgers. It was moved down the hill when Route 1 was re-routed in 1934. A true “Mom-and-Pop” establishment, Bertha (a mother of 9 children) was baker and manager of the cabins, while Percy developed additions to the diner.

In 1948, Percy Moody added a dining room. Over the years, the diner expanded from 70 seats to over 100 customer capacity. A gift shop for tourists visiting the famous diner was added in 1998. In March 1998, the iconic neon sign was upgraded. The original sign was lent to diner historian Richard Gutman, who curated the exhibit "Diners in the 21st Century" at Johnson & Wales' Culinary Archives & Museum in Providence, Rhode Island.

Moody's is famous for their desserts. General Manager Dan Beck stated in an interview: "Pies are one of the things that Moody’s is known for. We sell a ton of pies." Celebrity chef Bobby Flay visited Moody's Diner on his show Food Nation to sample their famous whoopie pies. The diner serves between 50 and 60 pies a day. Many recipes and cooking methods established by Bertha Moody are still incorporated into the present day menu; including cooking their doughnuts and making pie crusts with lard.

Dan Beck, Moody's current general manager, is the third generation of the Moody family to run the diner. Beck points out the aesthetic tradition of the diner from the classic neon sign to the well-worn formica counter-top where customers have sat at since the 1950s. "You do kind of step back in time," Beck says, "you’ll see the grooves where people slide the ketchup back and forth. And you’re gonna see waitstaff, some that have been here upwards of 50 years. All the same home cooked recipes, the desserts that were my grandmother's."

== Legacy ==
Each February, the Moody family celebrates "Founder’s Week" by recognizing the diner's heritage with discounts and specials honoring their loyal customers.

The diner dons their walls with hundreds of photographs from customers wearing Moody's T-shirts in various destinations around the world.

American composer Aaron Robinson wrote the music and lyrics for Moody Blue; a musical based on the diner, its staff and customers.

In 1985, Maine Humorist Tim Sample wrote the book Saturday Night at Moody's Diner and Other Stories. It has been a regional best seller since its first publication; resulting in an updated reissue in 1996 published by Down East Books titled: The New Saturday Night at Moody's Diner and Other Stories.

== Bibliography ==
- Genthner, Nancy (1989). What's Cooking at Moody's Diner. Down East Books. ISBN 9780884480754.
- Sample, Tim (1996). Saturday Night at Moody's Diner and Other Stories. Harpswell Press. ISBN 9780884480365.
- Caron, Sarah Walker (2020). Classic Diners of Maine. ISBN 9781439670101.

== Honors ==
- Best Pancakes in America. Food Network. The Best Pancakes in Every State. Emily Lee.
- 8 Maine Restaurants Named Best in the Country. Q97.9. Moody’s Diner - Waldoboro, Maine.
