= Chris Mandia =

American film director

Chris Mandia is an American playwright, screenwriter, film director, and veteran from San Pedro, California. Serving two tours in Iraq as an infantryman in the United States Marine Corps, including 2003 invasion of Iraq and the First Battle of Fallujah. Mandia has won numerous awards for his work and received a Jack Nicholson scholarship to attend the MFA program at the University of Southern California's film school. His short play, "Fighting a Fish" won the Kennedy Center American College Theater Festival, Region VIII's competition in 2007 In 2010, he received an Operation In Their Boots fellowship and “Get Some,” a film he authored, was a Cannes Film Festival selection. In 2012 he co-wrote the multimedia physical theatre piece, Trajectories: Transformations with Meron Langsner for Evet Arts. The piece was based on interviews with servicemen from the Iraq and Afghanistan wars and was performed in Boston and Chicago.

Mandia is known for his work on VET Tv, an over-the-top (OTT) media service that specializes in producing and distributing military comedy films and television series whose primary audience is the military and veteran community. VET Tv was founded by Donny O’Malley in June 2016 and is based in San Diego, California.

Mandia currently serves as an English professor at Lone Star College and The University of Houston.
