= Waldo Theatre =

- U.S. National Register of Historic Places
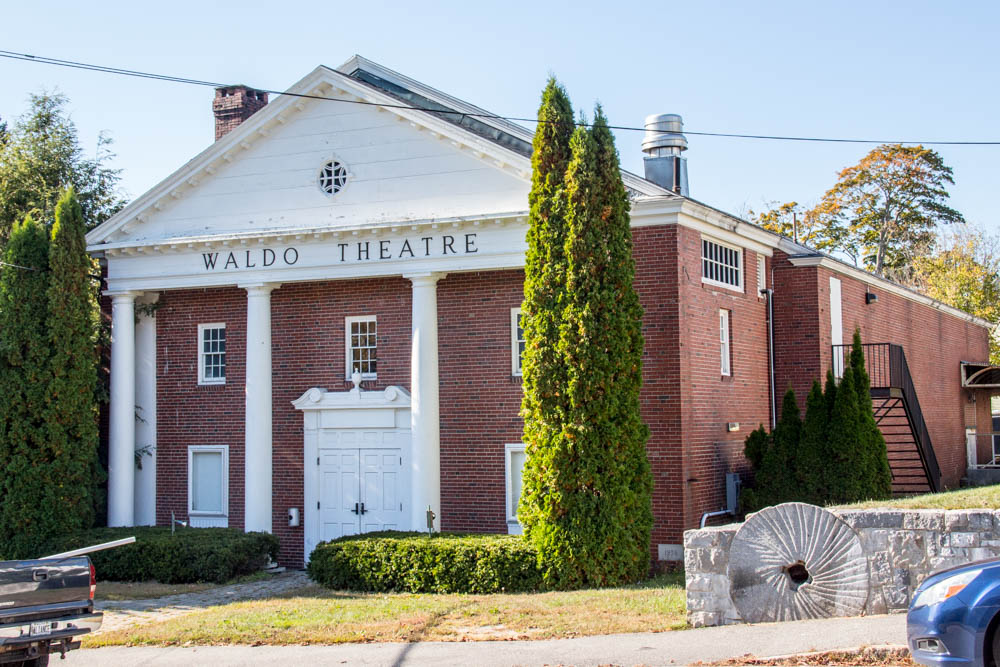

- Location within Maine Location within the United States
- Location: 916 Main St., Waldoboro, Maine
- Coordinates: 44°5′45″N 69°22′30″W
- Area: 1 acre (0.40 ha)
- Built: 1936
- Architect: Benjamin Schlanger
- NRHP reference No.: 86002434
- Added to NRHP: September 11, 1986

The Waldo Theatre is a historic movie theater and performance venue at 916 Main Street in Waldoboro, Maine. Built in 1936 as a movie theater to a design by New York City architect Benjamin Schlanger, it was hailed at the time as one of the best-designed state-of-the-art small theaters in the country. It is now managed by a non-profit arts organization. It was listed on the National Register of Historic Places in 1986.

== Description and history ==
The Waldo Theatre stands on the north side of Waldoboro's downtown Main Street, next door to the former U.S. Customhouse and Post Office. It is a two-story masonry structure with brick walls, wooden trim, and a gabled roof. The front has a Classical temple appearance, with four Tuscan columns rising to an entablature and fully pedimented gable. The gable rake edge and cornice are studded with modillions. The interior has minimal decoration, with that present suggestive of the Art Deco period.

The construction of the theater is important in a number of respects. It is certainly one of the first envelope (building within a building) structures to be built and when warm air is circulated between the inner and outer partitions, human bodies can provide much of the necessary space heat on even the coldest winter day. Using steel, concrete, plaster, and metal laths, Schlanger built a space between the inner and outer walls wide enough for a person to walk through. A sophisticated ventilation system directs hot air down and cold air up and assures a complete change of air every few minutes. Comprised largely of steel concrete and brick, the building is essentially fireproof.

The theater was built in 1936 by the local Cooney family, to a design by New York architect Benjamin Schlanger, who was well known for his theater designs. Its design features included seats of varying width, as well as some seats fitted for the hearing impaired.The floor is sloped, and the seats set at a slant, for more comfortable viewing of an elevated screen. The ventilation system was state of the art, allowing for rapid exchanges of air for climate control. The theater showed movies through the 1950s, and was then adapted for use by the local Masonic lodge, also seeing some use as a live performance venue. In 1993, The Waldo Theater became a non-profit organization and hosted a wide variety of community theatre performances and other events. There was a major renovation that began in 2019, and then re-opened in June of 2021. The theater has a 285 seating capacity.

== See also ==
- National Register of Historic Places listings in Lincoln County, Maine
