= Harriet Newell Haskell =

American educator and administrator (1835–1907)

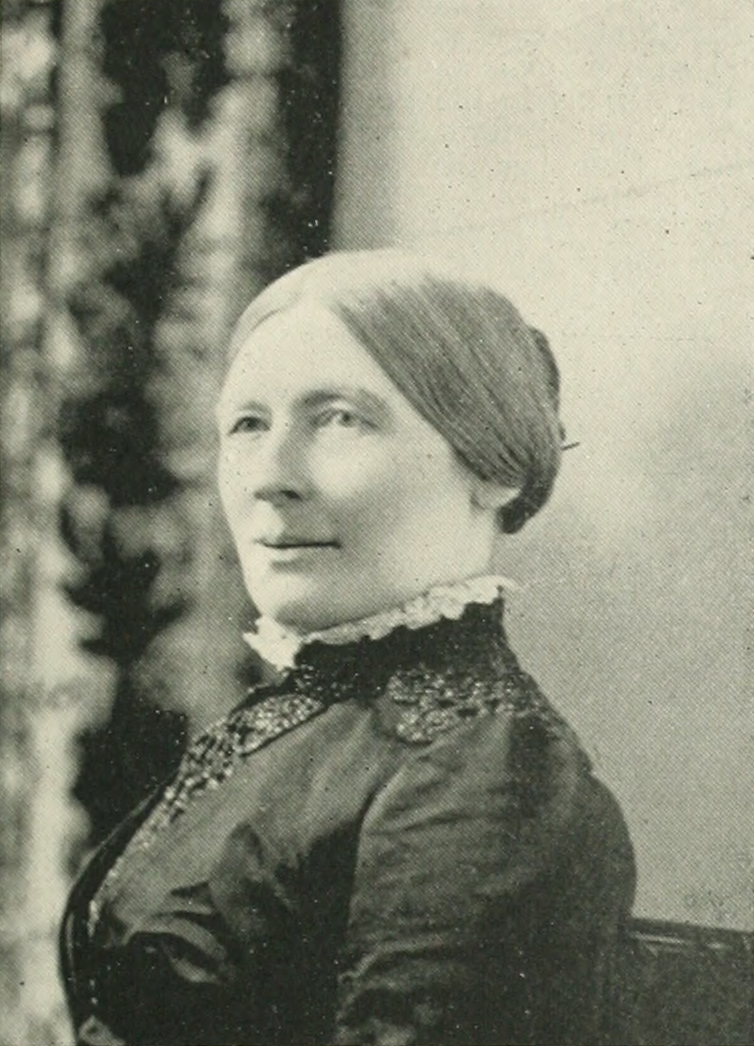
- Harriet Newell Haskell
- Born: January 14, 1835. Waldoboro, Maine
- Died: May 6, 1907 (aged 72); Monticello Seminary
- Occupations: Educator; school administrator
- Known for: Principal of Monticello Seminary

Harriet Newell Haskell (January 14, 1835 – May 6, 1907) was an American educator and school administrator from the U.S. state of Maine. She taught from 1855 to 1860 in Waldoboro, Maine and Boston, Massachusetts. From 1860 to 1868, she was a teacher and principal at Castleton Collegiate Seminary, Vermont. Thereafter, for 39 years, she served as principal at Monticello Seminary of Godfrey, Illinois.

== Early years and education ==
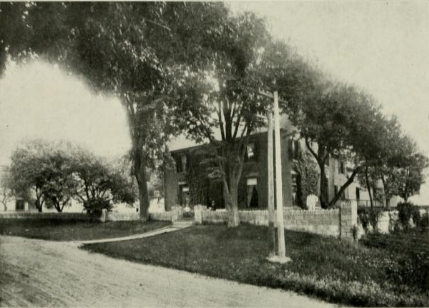
Haskell homestead in Waldoboro, Maine

Harriet Newell Haskell was born in Waldoboro, Maine, January 14, 1835. Her father was Bela B. Haskell, a banker and shipbuilder, and a citizen of Lincoln County, Maine. He served two terms in the Maine Legislature and was collector of customs of his district under President Zachary Taylor.

Haskell completed her normal school education in 1850. She attended Castleton Collegiate Seminary, Vermont, (now Castleton University) where she prepared herself in English, mathematics, and classics. Her freshman and sophomore college courses were completed at Middlebury College, in Vermont. From Mount Holyoke Seminary (now Mount Holyoke College), Massachusetts, she was graduated with honor in 1855. In 1905, she attended the 50 year anniversary of her graduation from Mount Holyoke, and was honored at that time with a Litt.d. degree.

== Career ==
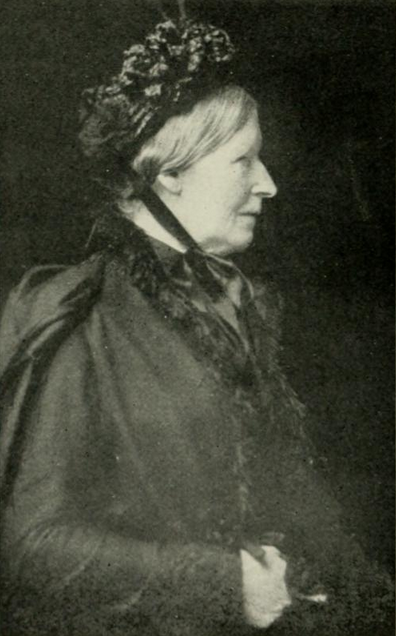
Portrait of Harriet Newell Haskell in later life

Haskell's first experience in teaching was in Boston, in the Franklin school. Afterwards, she was principal of the high school in her own town, and later at Castleton Collegiate School (1862–67). While she was at that school, the Rev. Truman Marcellus Post, D. D., president of the board of trustees of Monticello Seminary wrote to a friend in Maine, asking him if he could recommend to him a woman to take the then-vacant place of principal of Monticello. He was seeking a woman who was a scholar, a Christian, of good business capacity, and a good educator as well. The friend replied that there was only one such woman in the world, and that was Haskell, of Castleton College, but that she could not be removed from the State of Vermont.

After three years of solicitation, Haskell became principal of Monticello, in 1868. A portrait of Haskell, painted by J. J. Collins of Boston, was given to Monticello in 1882. The last years of her father's life were passed with her in the seminary; he died in 1887. The Monticello Seminary was destroyed by fire in November, 1888, just as the institution was beginning its second half-century. Through Haskell's energetic efforts a temporary building was put up, and the school was reopened with 89 of the 130 young women who were in the institution when the fire came. In less than two years, the buildings were erected with the cornerstone of the new building laid on 10 June 1889. The left side of Haskell's face was burned at Christmas time one year when her fake Santa Claus beard caught on fire; thereafter, she favored her right profile. Haskell advocated sports for women.

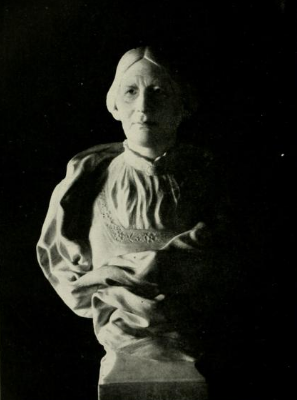
Marble bust by Hillis Arnold

A white marble Ruckstuhl statue of Haskell, a commissioned work by sculptor Hillis Arnold, was unveiled during the commencement exercises in June 1900, and placed in the Monticello library. The unveiling and presentation of the portrait of Haskell occurred during the same commencement exercises in 1900. On June 9, 1902, the Harriet Newell Haskell Scholarship of US$5,000, was founded by Emeline Frisbie Rea, of St. Louis, in honor of Haskell.

== Personal life and legacy ==
While attending Mount Holyoke, Haskell made the acquaintance of Emily Gilmore Alden, and the two became constant companions and had a common home for 55 years. Alden served as Haskell's assistant at Monticello. Though Haskell did not have children of her own, she raised two nieces. One was Lila ("Kitty") Haskell Burdick, and the other, Elizabeth Porter Haskell, was a member of Monticello's faculty during the period of 1898 to 1907.

Haskell died May 6, 1907, at Monticello, (Note: According to the St. Albans Daily Messenger (18 May 1907), Haskell died in St. Louis.) of heart disease. She had been ill for several weeks in her apartment at Monticello. Burial was at the family plot in Waldoboro.

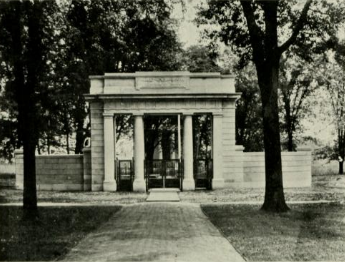
Haskell memorial entrance at Monticello

After Haskell's death, in 1908, Alden published Haskell's biography. A memorial stone wall in front of the grounds at Monticello Seminary was finished in December 1910. The wall, 1,000 feet (300 m) in length, with an elaborate arch and gateway, was erected to the memory of Haskell by the alumnae of the institution. Haskell House, a girls' dormitory at Monticello college, was dedicated on May 29, 1938. The Harriet Newell Haskell Society was established in 1963 at Monticello.
