= Benjamin Godfrey Memorial Chapel =

- U.S. National Register of Historic Places
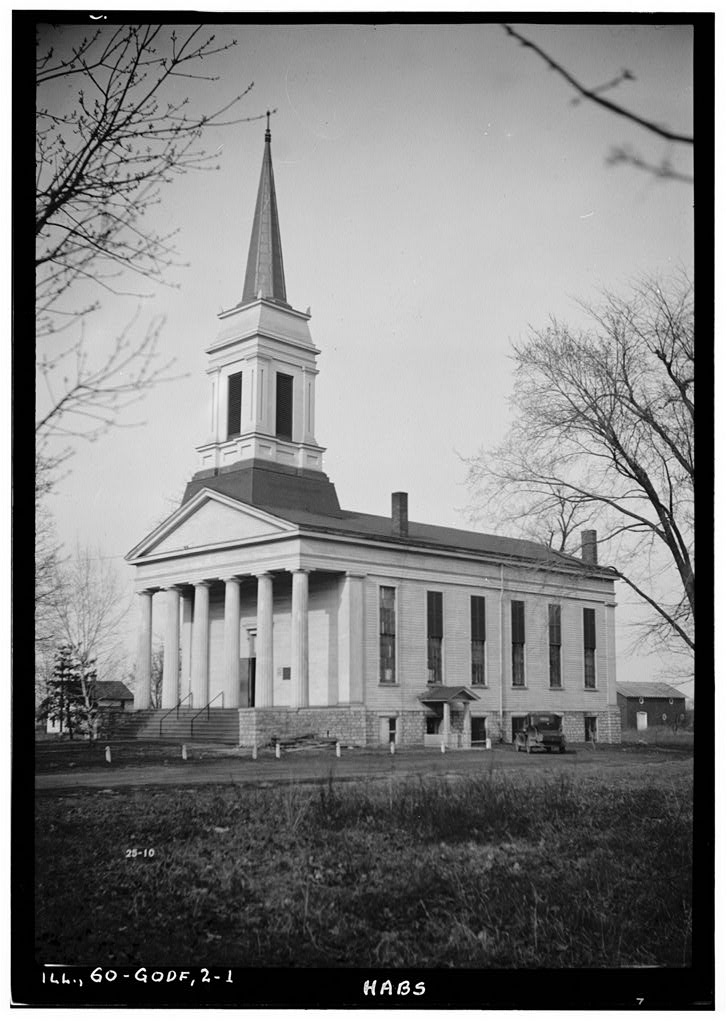
- 1934 image of the building from the Historic American Buildings Survey

- Location within Illinois Location within the United States
- Location: Godfrey Rd., Godfrey, Illinois
- Coordinates: 38°57′1″N 90°11′29″W
- Area: 0 acres (0 ha)
- Built: 1854
- Architectural style: Greek Revival
- NRHP reference No.: 79000856
- Added to NRHP: May 10, 1979

The Benjamin Godfrey Memorial Chapel is a historic chapel located on the campus of Lewis and Clark Community College in Godfrey, Illinois, named for school and town founder Benjamin Godfrey. The chapel was built in 1854 to serve the Church of Christ, a church formed by three Christian denominations at the Monticello Female Seminary. The Greek Revival chapel has a raised temple front with six Doric columns supporting a pediment; a Gothic steeple rises above the entrance. The Historic American Buildings Survey documented the church in 1934 and named it one of the six most representative New England–style churches built outside of New England. Monticello Female Seminary, later known as Monticello College, used the chapel for daily religious services, convocation and commencement ceremonies, and student productions and performances. In 1971, Monticello College closed, and Lewis and Clark Community College took over its campus.

The chapel was added to the National Register of Historic Places on May 10, 1979.
