= Emily Reed (ship) =

History
- Name: Emily Reed
- Owner: Yates & Porterfield NY; Hind, Rolph and Co. San Francisco
- Port of registry: American
- Builder: A. R. Reed, Waldoboro, Maine
- Launched: November 1880
- Completed: 1880
- Maiden voyage: New York To Calcutta
- In service: 1880–1908
- Identification: JVCB (LLoyds Signal Letters)
- Fate: Ran aground on February 14, 1908

General characteristics
- Type: Down Easter
- Tonnage: 1,467 NRT
- Length: 215 ft (66 m)
- Beam: 40 ft 6 in (12.34 m)
- Depth: 24 ft (7.3 m)
- Crew: O.D. Shelton; Daniel C Nichols; George A Baker; William Kessel

The Emily Reed was a down Easter owned by a company in San Francisco, and well known in both American and Australian ports. She ran aground in February 1908 off the coast of Oregon, with the loss of eight men.

== Career ==
The Emily Reed was built by A. R. Reed, Waldoboro, Maine, for the San Franciscan firm of Hind, Rolph and Co. She was launched on November 10, 1880; her first captain was O. D. Sheldon, and her first owners Yates and Porterfield of New York. On her first voyage, she transported a load of case oil from New York to Calcutta.

In December 1890 or January 1891, while en route from New York to San Francisco (having departed approximately February 1890), a severe storm at sea caused the rudder head to be twisted clean off. The crew steered the ship by tackle over each quarter, eventually reaching port in Rio de Janeiro for repairs. They arrived in San Francisco 208 days later, on August 31, 1891.

Daniel C. Nichols took command of the Emily Reed in Hong Kong, until in April 1900 she was sold in Tacoma, Washington, to Hind Rolf.

On July 12, 1903, the ship was carrying Tasmanian timber from Hobart to Simonstown, South Africa, when it ran into distress and was forced to stop at Lyttelton. The captain, Baker, had received a serious injury to his left arm, and there was sickness on board. The vessel was quarantined for eight days. Nine crew members were charged with disobeying orders, and the captain was charged by his crew of assault. The men were convicted, but the charges against the captain were dismissed.

== Wreck ==
On February 14, 1908, the ship was heading for Portland, with a cargo of coal from Newcastle, New South Wales, when she ran aground at the mouth of Nehalem River. Captain Kessell's chronometer was faulty, and he didn't realize until it was too late that he was too close to the shore. The time was a little after midnight, and the sea was too rough to attempt to swim to safety. The first mate, the ship's cook, and two more seamen jumped into a lifeboat, and appeared to be lost as soon as they hit the water. The captain therefore ordered the rest of his crew to remain on the ship until daylight. When morning came, it brought low tide, and the survivors managed to get ashore. The ship's cargo of 2,100 tons of coal was washed out to sea without a trace.

It was initially reported, based on the account of the captain, that eleven men were dead. Three days later, however, the lifeboat which had been thought lost was discovered by a sloop at Neah Bay, 200 miles from the wreck. The first mate and two seamen were alive but weak with thirst and hunger, and the ship's cook was dead.

The wreck still lies buried beneath the sands near the city of Rockaway Beach, and is occasionally uncovered by storms.

== Sightings ==
- December 9, 1880; Arrived New York City, Possibly maiden voyage; Sheldon, Waldoboro, Me. In ballast to Yates & Porterfield;
- August 19, 1882 Arrived Kobe Japan (Hiogin) in 116 Days
- April 25, 1883; Liverpool For San Francisco,
- August 25, 1885; New York – Loading for San Francisco voyage
- February 26, 1886; Pitcairn Island, en-route San Francisco to Liverpool, Master: Sheldon
- May 3, 1888; Depart Melbourne for London
- August 24, 1889; Possibly Philadelphia PA;
- June 1, 1890; Arrived San Francisco from Hisyo Japan with load of coal and merchandise, Captain Sheldon
- July 12, 1890; Leave San Francisco, destination unknown
- October 4, 1890; Arrive Rio de Janeiro, suffering damage, lost boats, house, etc. Captain Sheldon
- January 20, 1891; New York City loading for San Francisco
- February 4, 1891; Depart New York for San Francisco
- March 4, 1891, Spoke at Sea (Mid Atlantic) 4 N 23 W, Bound for San Francisco
- August 27, 1891; 204 Days at Sea – still en route for San Francisco
- August 31, 1891; Arrived San Francisco, story of damage en route, broken rudder, stop in Rio de Janeiro
- October 11, 1891; Chartered for Liverpool, Cargo Wheat
- October 29, 1891; Correction: Cork Ireland
- March 26, 1892; Arrived Dublin, via Queenstown?
- July 17, 1892; Advertisement for New York Freight
- July 21, 1892, Loading NYC for San Francisco
- September 22, 1892, NYC – Cleared for San Francisco
- March 2, 1893, Arrived San Francisco, Captain Simmons
- March 28, 1893, Loading Redwood for the UK
- July 11, 1893, Spoken at Sea, For Queenstown
- September 28, 1893, Arrived Liverpool via Queenstown
- May 12, 1894; Sighted in Straits of Sunda en route New York to Hong Kong;
- January 1894; Hong Kong – Received Lending Library from Sea Man's Friend
- July 23, 1895, Philadelphia, Captain Eldridge W. Simmons fined for improper payment of a seaman
- Next port of call Cienfuegos, Cuba
- 1895 – Arrived at Manila Philippines from Hong Kong;
- August 8, 1985 – From England to Philadelphia, and Japan with case oil.
- Dec 10, 1896 – Spoken at Lat 5N, Long 25W – Nichols, enroute New York to Hiogo (Japan?)
- January 5, 1898; passed ship Venezuela at sea, Location: lat 34 50. lon 72 27, from Hlogo (Kobe, Japan) for New York.
- October 29, 1888, Singapore
- Nov 7 – 1888 Departed Singapore
- March 9, 1899 Arrive New York From Singapore, Damage to top mast
- September 25, 1899 – Singapore
- September 28, 1899 – Singapore (Damaged ship?)
- April 22, 1900, Port Townsend, Washington, From Hong Kong,
- August 1, 1900; Kahului Hi; Capt. George A. Baker – Departed to San Francisco
- August 24, 1900; San Francisco; Capt. George A. Baker – Arrived in port (From Kahului HI, 23 days at sea)
- November 19, 1900; Sydney NSW Australia; Capt. George A. Baker – Arrive in port (From San Francisco)
- February 5, 1901; In port Sydney, NSW; Caught in Hurricane, partly demasted
- 1901 Generally – San Francisco to Sydney, Hong Kong, Puget Sound
- October 1901; Honolulu, HI; Capt. George A. Baker – Jumps bail and sails away
- January 2, 1902; Sailed from Sydney NSW Australia, Captain Baker to San Francisco
- June 21, 1902; Maui, Hi; Capt. George A Baker; leaves for the "sound" to load coal (?New Castle AUS?)
- December 27, 1902 – Cape Town South Africa from Chemainus
- April 2, 1903; Spoken @ 43S 106.18E; en route Delagoa Bay to Hobart
- July 31, 1903; New Zealand; Capt. George A. Baker – altercation on-board between crew members
- May ?? 1903; Deiagoa Bay, Mozambique (Now: Maputo Bay); Leave for Hobart Tasmania
- April 10, 1903; Passage at sea 43 deg S, 108 deg E in route, "All Is Well"
- April 13, 1903; Passage Point, Hobart Tasmania; Arrived to pickup shipment of piles to South Africa
- May 20, 1903; Finders Bay (Norfolk Bay), Tasmania to complete loading;
- June 22, 1903 – The Mercury, Page 2, Column 2; Letter to the editor mentions departure to South Africa.
- October 11, 1905 – Portland Oregon, chartered for wheat transport to San Francisco

== Further research ==
- Reported more detail in Wiliam Fairburn's Merchant Sail, Volume V
- Penobscot Main Marine Museum Picture
