= Symphony Space =

Performing arts organization in New York City

- Symphony Theatre
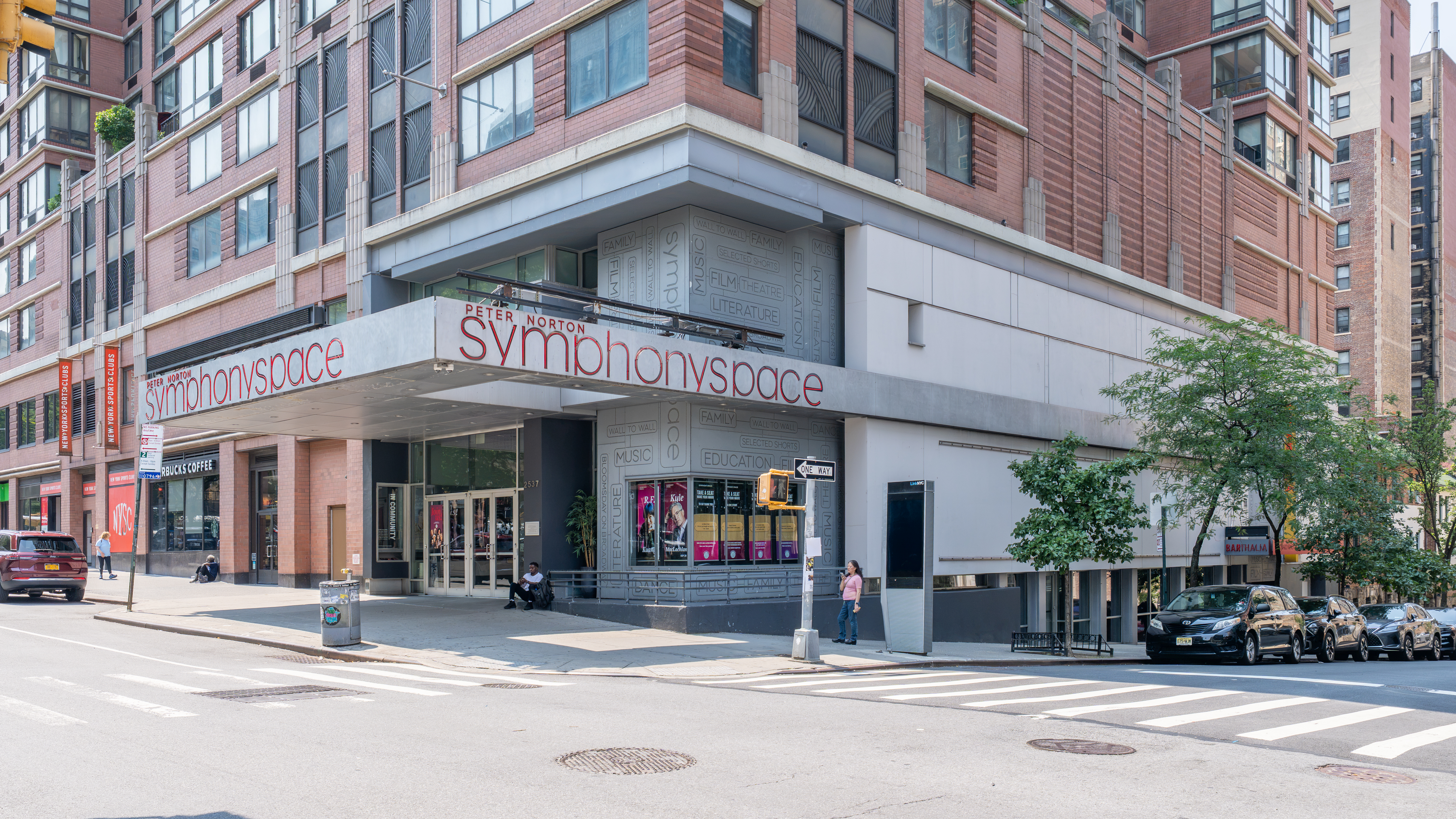
- (2026)
- Interactive map of Symphony Space
- Address: 2537 Broadway; New York City; United States
- Coordinates: 40.794615°N 73.972197°W
- Operator: Symphony Space, Inc.
- Capacity: Peter Jay Sharp Theatre: 760; Leonard Nimoy Thalia: 160

Construction
- Reopened: 1978

Website
- www.symphonyspace.org

Symphony Space, founded by Isaiah Sheffer and Allan Miller, is a multi-disciplinary performing arts organization at 2537 Broadway on the Upper West Side of Manhattan in New York City. Performances take place in the 760-seat Peter Jay Sharp Theatre (also called Peter Norton Symphony Space) or the 160-seat Leonard Nimoy Thalia. Programs include music, dance, theater, film, and literary readings. In addition, Symphony Space provides literacy programs and the Curriculum Arts Project, which integrates performing arts into social studies curricula in New York City Public Schools.

Symphony Space traces its beginnings to a free marathon concert, Wall to Wall Bach, held on January 9, 1978, organized by Isaiah Sheffer and Alan Miller. From 1978 to 2001, the theater hosted all of the New York productions by the New York Gilbert and Sullivan Players.

As of 2010, Symphony Space hosts 600 or more events annually, including an annual free music Wall to Wall marathon; Bloomsday on Broadway (celebrating James Joyce's Ulysses); and Selected Shorts, broadcast nationally over Public Radio International. The New York company of Revels, Inc., also holds its shows there.

== Early history of the building ==
From 1915 to 1917, Vincent Astor spent $750,000 of his personal fortune on the Astor Market, a two-storey mini-mall of stands occupying the southwest corner of 95th and Broadway. The intention was to sell fruit, meat, fish, produce, and flowers at inexpensive prices, achieved through large economies of scale. As was common with Astor's building projects, flamboyance dominated the architecture, including a 290-foot William Mackay sgraffito frieze depicting farmers bringing their goods to market.

The market proved a failure. In 1917, Astor sold the market to Thomas J. Healy. The stalls were demolished and the main space was converted into the Crystal Palace, a skating rink, and the smaller basement area became the Sunken Gardens, a restaurant. Both were eventually turned into movie theaters. The rink became Symphony Theater and in 1931 the restaurant was turned into Thalia Theater.

Symphony Theater had an undistinguished history, and by the 1970s was used for boxing and wrestling. The site was used for Wall to Wall Bach, and led Sheffer and Miller to lease the building and form Symphony Space.

== Thalia Theater ==
The Thalia Theater was built by the experienced theater architect Raymond Irrera, and his novice assistant, Ben Schlanger. Schlanger introduced numerous innovations, including the "reverse parabolic" design for the floor.

After World War II, the Thalia gained a reputation as an arty repertory film theater. Its regular patrons included Woody Allen, Peter Bogdanovich, and Martin Scorsese. Woody Allen used it in Annie Hall.

The Thalia closed in 1987, its future clouded by disputes between Symphony Space and various developers. Symphony Space had purchased the building in 1978 for $10,010 dollars, drastically below market value, as part of a legal, symbiotic tax-minimizing scheme, the structure of which gave the previous owners a fixed-price option to repurchase the building in the following decades for a similarly low price. In 1985, Symphony Space reneged on the scheme, leading to a decade of acrimonious litigation. Due to an esoteric application of the rule against perpetuities, the repurchase option was deemed unenforceable by the Court of Appeals of New York in 1996, and Symphony Space retained ownership of the building. After Symphony Space won, the Thalia reopened briefly in 1993 and again in 1996. In 1999, Sheffer had the Art Deco interior gutted as unsalvageable, angering some neighborhood preservationists. The interior was used as a staging area for construction of a 22-story apartment building above Symphony Space. Afterwards the interior was rebuilt as a theater again, and in 2002 the space was re-opened as the Leonard Nimoy Thalia, acknowledging the actor's financing.

A sister movie theater to the original uptown Thalia, Thalia Soho, continued from 1987 until owner Richard Schwarz's death, then operated for a short time as Le Cinematographe and later as Soho Playhouse. In 2017, the theater and apartments above were reportedly on the market.

In 2026, Symphony Space announced plans to close the Peter Jay Sharp and Leonard Nimoy Thalia theaters for renovation at the end of that year. The $45 million project was scheduled to take 15 months and be completed in 2028.
