= Waldoboro, Maine =

Town in Maine, United States

- Town
- Seal
- Motto: "Home of the Five Masted Schooner"
- Location in Lincoln County and the state of Maine
- Coordinates: 44°06′42″N 69°22′12″W
- Country: United States
- State: Maine
- County: Lincoln
- Incorporated: June 29, 1773
- Named for: Samuel Waldo

Area
  - Total: 78.86 sq mi (204.25 km^{2})
  - Land: 71.50 sq mi (185.18 km^{2})
  - Water: 7.36 sq mi (19.06 km^{2})
- Elevation: 161 ft (49 m)

Population (2020)
  - Total: 5,154
  - Density: 72/sq mi (27.8/km^{2})
- Time zone: UTC-5 (Eastern (EST))
  - Summer (DST): UTC-4 (EDT)
- ZIP Code: 04572
- GNIS feature ID: 582786
- Website: www.waldoboromaine.org

Waldoboro is a town in Lincoln County, Maine, United States. The population was 5,154 at the 2020 census. It contains the census-designated place of the same name. Waldoboro was incorporated in 1773 and developed a reputation as a ship building and port facility from the banks of the Medomak River. The town's strong agricultural and fishing legacy continues today, with recently renewed enthusiasm for traditional natural fiber production, cheesemaking, farm brewing, fermentation, soapmaking, and other lost agrarian arts. Waldoboro is becoming a popular destination, with miles of scenic river frontage, a thriving arts community, and historical interest in its past as a German settlement.

== History ==
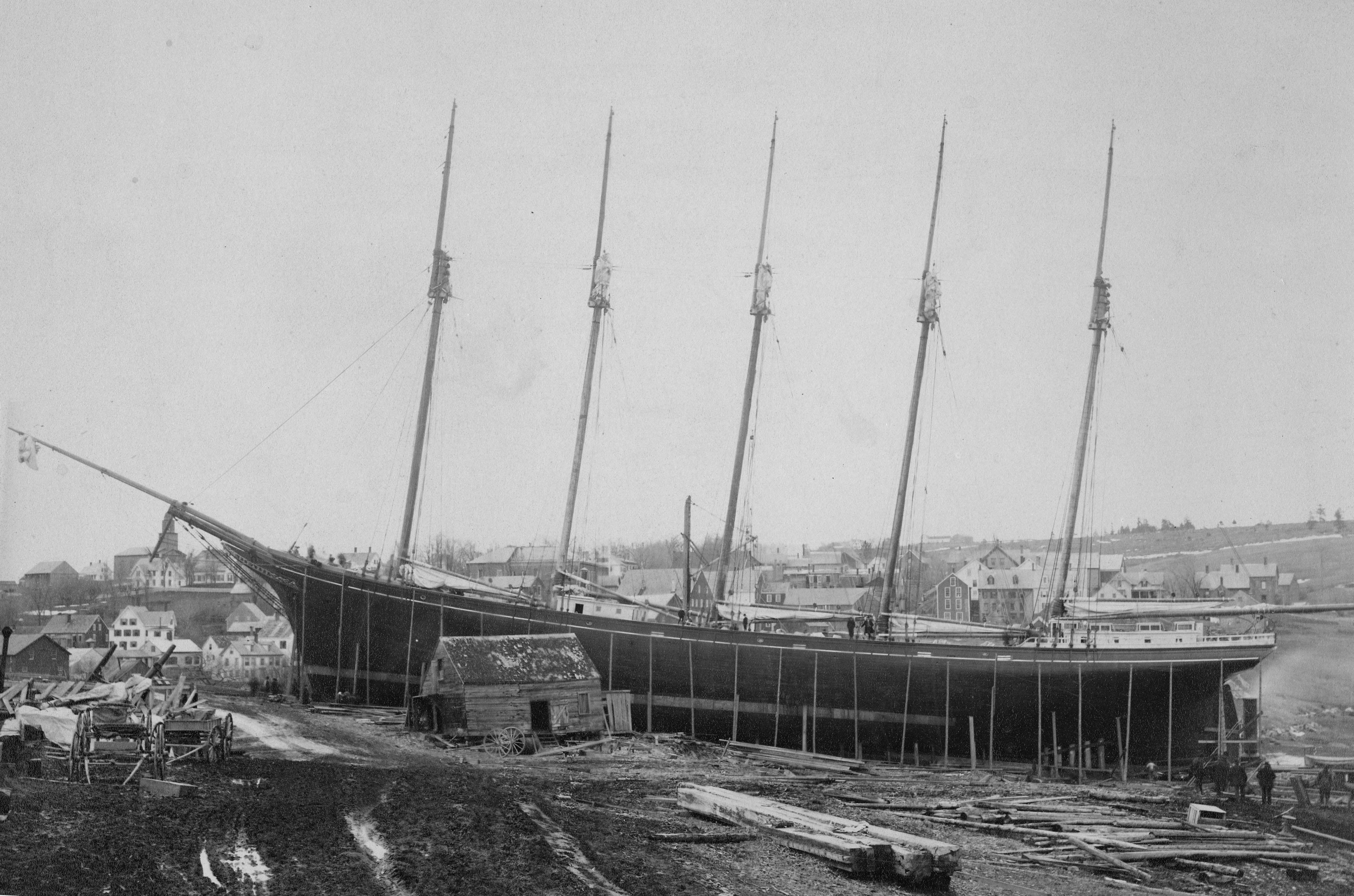
Preparing schooner Governor Ames for launch, 1888

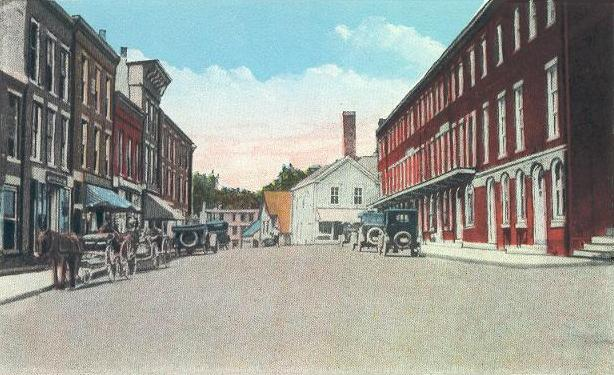
Friendship Street c. 1920

In 1629 the area that would become Waldoboro was granted to John Beauchamp of London and Thomas Leverett of Boston, England, and was known as the Muscongus Patent. The patent lay dormant until 1719 when Leverett's great-grandson, John Leverett, President of Harvard College, revived the ancient claim and formed the Lincolnshire Proprietors, also known as the Ten Proprietors, so named for the ten shares distributed, one to each member. General Samuel Waldo of Boston acquired a controlling interest in the patent in 1729 and it henceforward become known as the Waldo Patent.

Following Dummer's War, the area represented the easternmost extension of the Province of Massachusetts and was protected by Fort St. George. First called Broad Bay, the village was settled between 1733 and 1740, but suffered a devastating attack as part of the Northeast Coast Campaign (1746) by Native Americans allied with New France during King George's War. Houses were burned and inhabitants killed or carried away as captives. Survivors fled to the nearby settlements of St. George or Pemaquid. Peace returned with the 1748 Treaty of Aix-la-Chapelle.

New Englanders aware of these wartime losses were reluctant to resettle this vulnerable frontier, so from 1741 to 1753, Samuel Waldo, son of the general Jonathan Waldo, visited Germany and recruited about 1,500 immigrants to Waldoboro. Some were followers of Martin Luther and Huldrych Zwingli but they did not immigrate for religious reasons like the Pilgrims but for "...increasing their worldly goods.", most from the Rhineland. Waldo hired Sebastian Zouberbuhler as an agent. Many settled on the western side of Broad Bay, although in 1763–1764 the land was claimed under the Pemaquid Patent. About 300 residents moved to the Moravian settlements in what is now Forsyth County, North Carolina, but the remainder bought their properties. On June 29, 1773, the township was incorporated as Waldoborough, named for the original proprietor.

Waldoboro became county seat of Lincoln County in 1786, but the designation would shift to Wiscasset in 1880. Farms produced hay and potatoes. The Knox and Lincoln Railroad arrived and spurred the town's development. Industries would include an iron foundry, an oakum mill, a carding and cloth-dressing mill, a grain mill, sawmills and planing mills, furniture and molding mills, a door, sash and blind factory, and a carriage factory. There were also marble and granite yards and a pottery. But ship building was the principal business, with eight large vessels built in 1880. During the 19th century Maine became famous for its great shipbuilding center. Waldoboro was the launching port for the Governor Ames in 1888, the first five masted schooner. The Governor Ames was built in Waldoboro's Leavitt Storer Shipyard. A port of entry, the town features an 1857 custom house designed by Ammi B. Young.

Waldoboro is also known for the Waldoboro style of hooked rugs, the Waldoboro green neck turnip, Moody's Diner and Morse's Sauerkraut, and Fawcetts Toy Museum.

== Places listed on the National Register of Historic Places ==
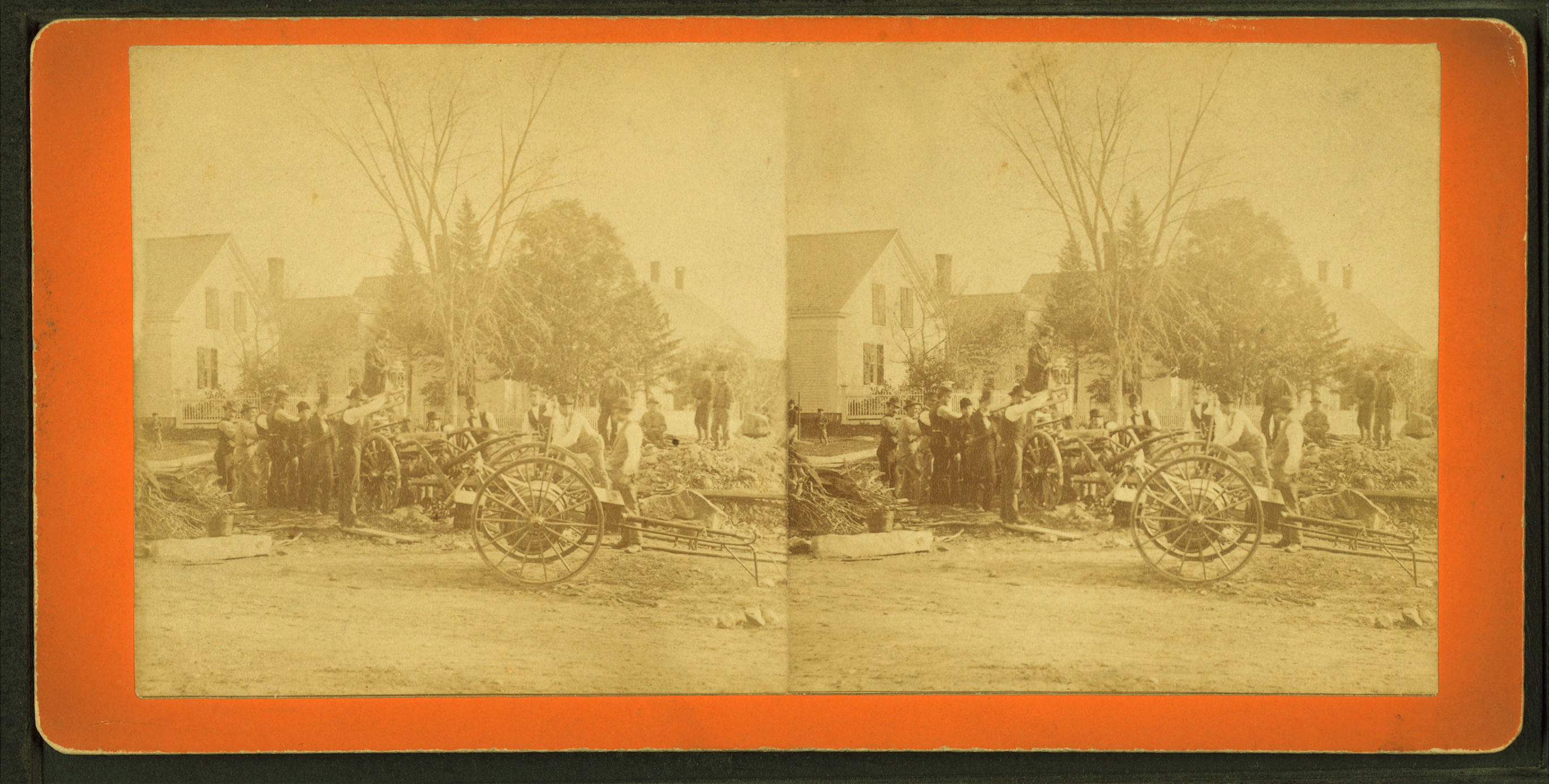
Waldoboro fire hand-pumper Triumph and hose reel. This image is available from the New York Public Library's Digital Library under the digital ID G89F253_015F

- German Church and Cemetery
- Hutchins House (Hall Funeral Home)
- Ludwig, Godfrey, House
- U.S. Customhouse and Post Office
- Waldo Theatre built by Carroll Cooney
- Waldoborough Town Pound
- Wetherill Site

== Geography ==
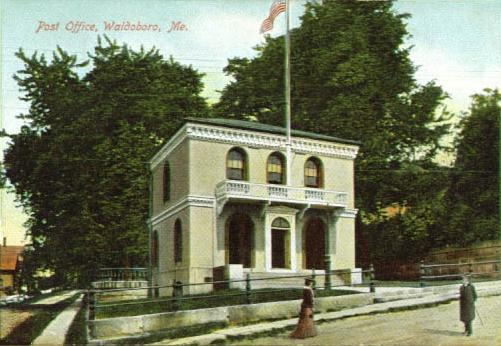
1857 Custom House and Post Office, as it appeared c. 1908

According to the United States Census Bureau, the town has a total area of 78.86 square miles (204.25 km^{2}), of which 71.50 square miles (185.18 km^{2}) is land and 7.36 square miles (19.06 km^{2}) is water. Waldoboro is located at the head of navigation on the Medomak River.

== Demographics ==
Historical population
Census	Pop.	Note	%±
1790	1,717		—
1800	1,511		−12.0%
1810	2,160		43.0%
1820	2,449		13.4%
1830	3,118		27.3%
1840	3,661		17.4%
1850	4,199		14.7%
1860	4,568		8.8%
1870	4,174		−8.6%
1880	3,758		−10.0%
1890	3,505		−6.7%
1900	3,145		−10.3%
1910	2,656		−15.5%
1920	2,421		−8.8%
1930	2,311		−4.5%
1940	2,497		8.0%
1950	2,536		1.6%
1960	2,882		13.6%
1970	3,146		9.2%
1980	3,985		26.7%
1990	4,601		15.5%
2000	4,916		6.8%
2010	5,075		3.2%
2020	5,154		1.6%
U.S. Decennial Census

=== 2010 census ===
As of the census of 2010, there were 5,075 people, 2,171 households, and 1,364 families residing in the town. The population density was 71.0 inhabitants per square mile (27.4/km^{2}). There were 2,651 housing units at an average density of 37.1 per square mile (14.3/km^{2}). The racial makeup of the town was 97.4% White, 0.4% African American, 0.5% Native American, 0.4% Asian, 0.2% from other races, and 1.1% from two or more races. Hispanic or Latino of any race were 1.0% of the population.

There were 2,171 households, of which 28.5% had children under the age of 18 living with them, 46.9% were married couples living together, 11.6% had a female householder with no husband present, 4.3% had a male householder with no wife present, and 37.2% were non-families. 29.7% of all households were made up of individuals, and 12.9% had someone living alone who was 65 years of age or older. The average household size was 2.34 and the average family size was 2.85.

The median age in the town was 43.5 years. 21.8% of residents were under the age of 18; 7% were between the ages of 18 and 24; 23.2% were from 25 to 44; 30.5% were from 45 to 64; and 17.5% were 65 years of age or older. The gender makeup of the town was 49.3% male and 50.7% female.

=== 2000 census ===
As of the 2000 census, there were 4,916 people, 1,983 households, and 1,348 families residing in the town. The population density was 69.1 inhabitants per square mile (26.7/km^{2}). There were 2,360 housing units at an average density of 33.1 per square mile (12.8/km^{2}). The racial makeup of the town was 98.62% White, 0.22% Black or African American, 0.14% Native American, 0.43% Asian, 0.08% Pacific Islander, 0.04% from other races, and 0.47% from two or more races. Hispanic or Latino of any race were 0.26% of the population.

There were 1,983 households, out of which 31.2% had children under the age of 18 living with them, 54.5% were married couples living together, 9.6% had a female householder with no husband present, and 32.0% were non-families. 25.7% of all households were made up of individuals, and 11.4% had someone living alone who was 65 years of age or older. The average household size was 2.45 and the average family size was 2.91.

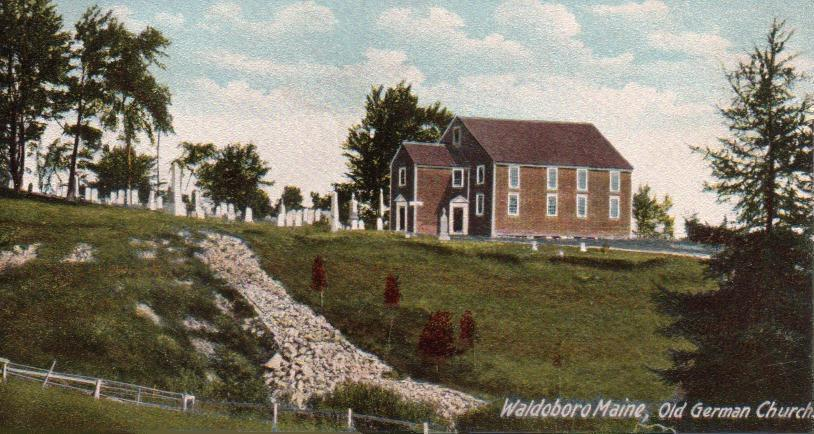
Old German Lutheran Church, built 1792, as it appeared c. 1905

In the town, the population was spread out, with 25.3% under the age of 18, 6.6% from 18 to 24, 26.7% from 25 to 44, 25.0% from 45 to 64, and 16.4% who were 65 years of age or older. The median age was 40 years. For every 100 females, there were 96.1 males. For every 100 females age 18 and over, there were 90.9 males.

The median income for a household in the town was $34,830, and the median income for a family was $41,042. Males had a median income of $30,788 versus $22,462 for females. The per capita income for the town was $17,117. About 9.7% of families and 12.9% of the population were below the poverty line, including 13.6% of those under age 18 and 12.6% of those age 65 or over.

== Infrastructure ==
=== Transportation ===
The town is served by U.S. Route 1 and state routes 32, 220 and 235.

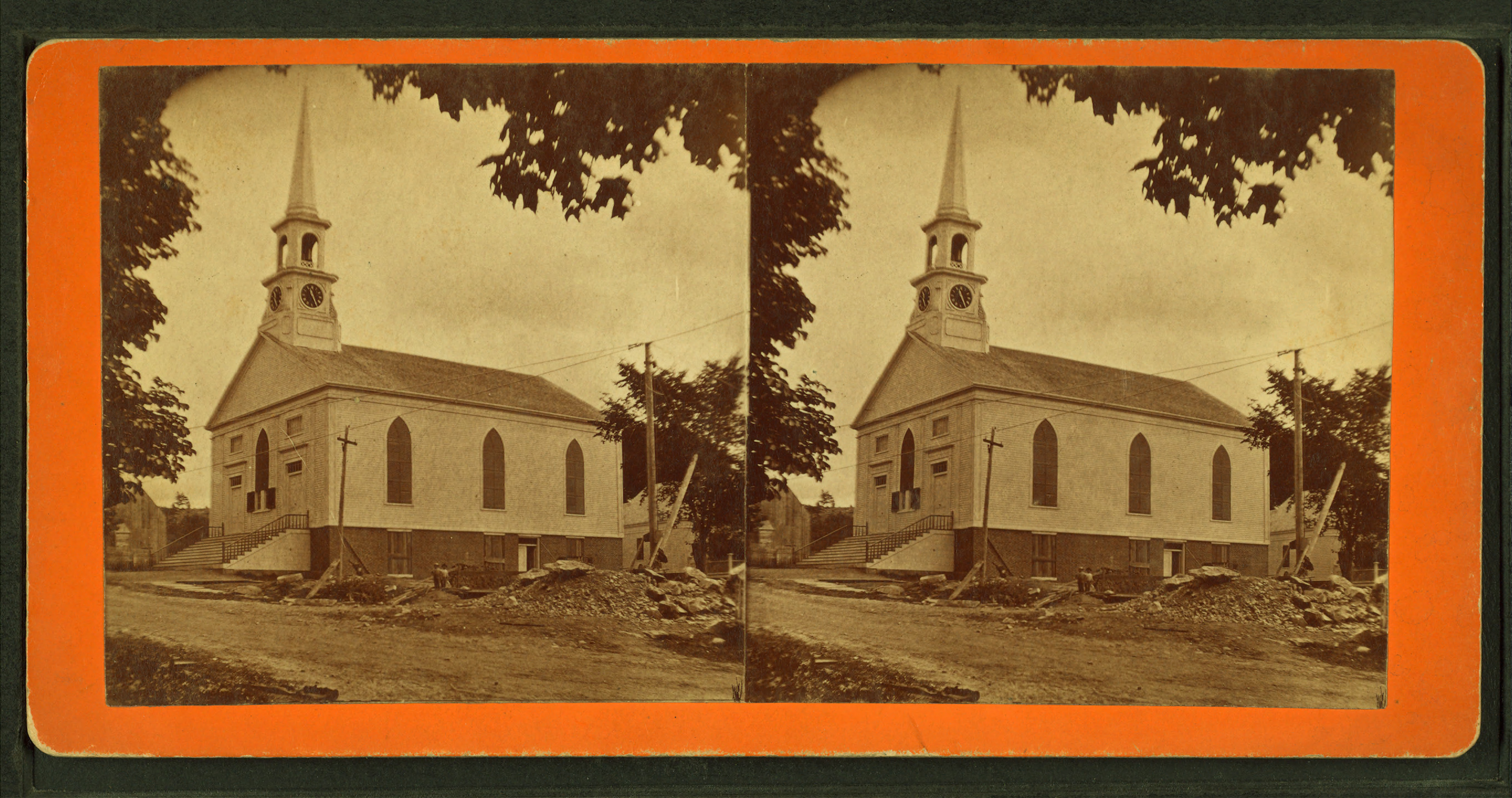
First Baptist Church building, now belonging to Broad Bay Congregational, before windows and bell tower changed. Fire cistern under construction.

== Education ==
Regional School Unit 40 operates public schools. Schools in Waldoboro:

- Medomak Valley High School — Grades 9–12
- Medomak Valley Middle School — Grades 7–8
- Miller Elementary School — Grades K–6
- Coastal Christian School - Grade K-12, private, Baptist

Waldoboro Public Library serves the community.

== Notable people ==
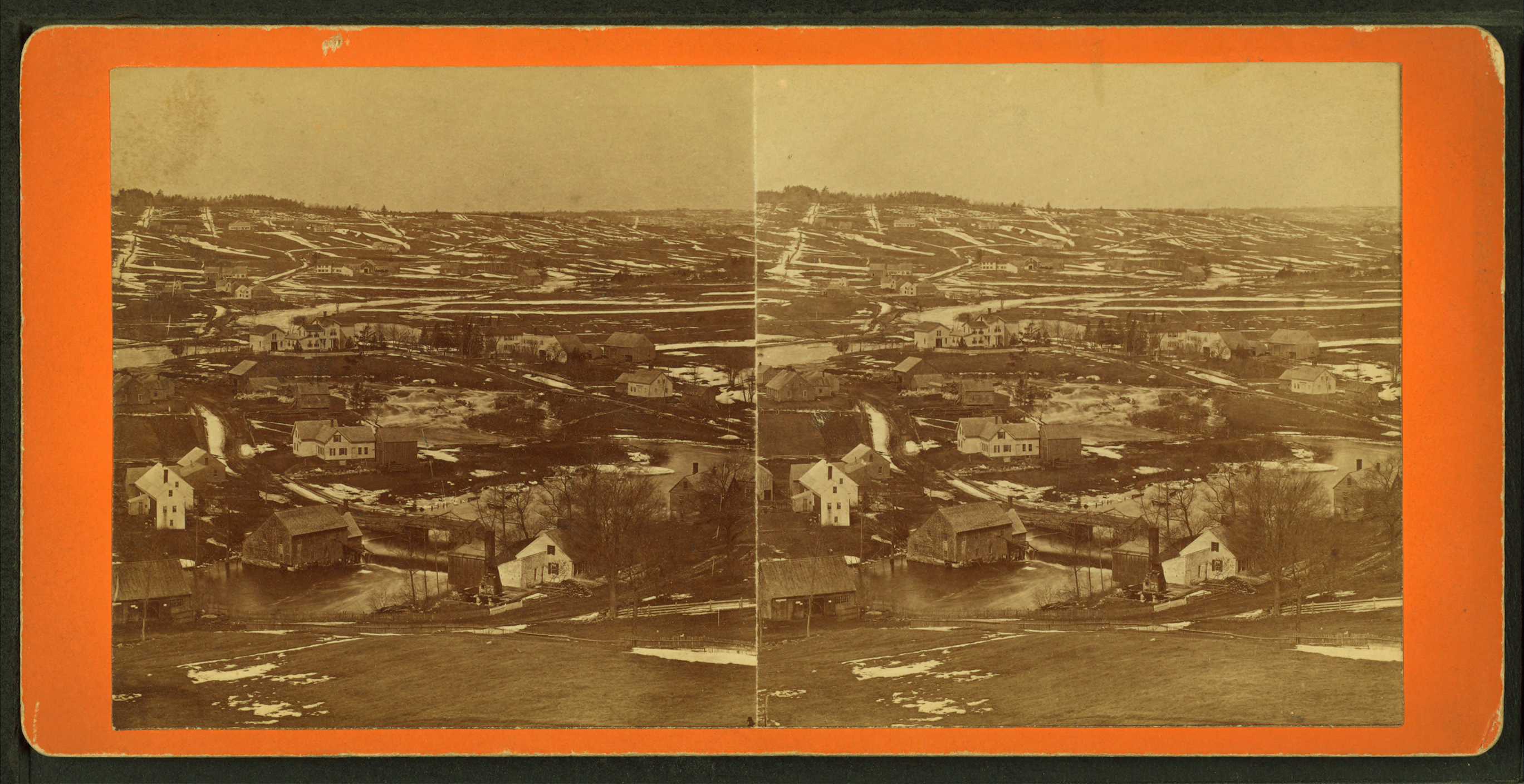
View of Waldoboro looking northeast across Mill Street, the upper falls and Elm Street. Original source: Robert N. Dennis collection of stereoscopic views.

- Benjamin Brown, member of the 14th United States Congress; practiced medicine in Waldoboro
- Carroll Trowbridge Cooney, college football player and theatre owner
- Robert Creeley, poet
- Tristan Dyer, filmmaker and Iraq War veteran; born in Waldoboro
- Ezra B. French, U.S. House of Representatives 1859–1861, assisted in organizing the Republican Party in 1856
- Harriet Newell Haskell (1835–1907), educator and administrator
- Conrad Heyer, Revolutionary War veteran and one of the earliest-born people known to have been photographed
- Sumner Jackson, medical doctor and member of the French Resistance in World War II
- John Harvey Lovell, naturalist and author; born and lived in Waldoboro
- Sebastian Streeter Marble, 41st governor of Maine
- John William McCormack, U.S House of Representatives, Speaker of the House.
- Douglas J. Parent, Waldoboro proprietor, his 1983 murder has never been solved
- Frederick G. Payne, US senator, 60th governor of Maine
- Isaac Reed, US congressman; born in Waldoboro
- Frederick Robie, 39th governor of Maine; practiced medicine in Waldoboro for a time
- Aaron Robinson, musician and composer
- Augusta Emma Stetson, religious leader; born in Waldoboro
- Clyde Sukeforth, Major League Baseball player and agent
- David Trahan, politician, executive director of the Sportsman's Alliance of Maine
- Samuel Waldo, merchant and proprietor of Waldo County and the towns of Waldo and Waldoboro

== See also ==
- Emily Reed (ship)
- Paul Palmer (schooner)
- Pemaquid River
- Muscongus Bay
- Rockland Branch
- Maine School Administrative District 40
