= In Their Boots =

American TV documentary series

- Country of origin: United States
- Original language: English
- No. of seasons: 2

Production
- Executive producers: Robert Greenwald, Richard Ray Perez
- Producers: Amanda Spain, Abe Forman-Greenwald

Original release
- Network: online
- Release: July 2, 2008 – present

In Their Boots is a documentary series about the impact the War in Iraq and the War in Afghanistan are having on people at home in the United States. Every episode features a documentary about how the servicemen and women of the American armed forces, their families, and American communities have been changed by the nation's campaigns in Iraq and Afghanistan. The show has covered issues such as the effects of deployment, post-traumatic stress disorder, traumatic brain injury, recovery from physical injury, military widows, partners of gays in the military, homelessness, women in the military, and sexual assault in the military. In 2010, In Their Boots launched Operation In Their Boots, which gave 5 combat veterans the opportunity to produce and direct their own documentaries.

In Their Boots is funded by a grant from the Iraq Afghanistan Deployment Impact Fund (IADIF) of the California Community Foundation and is produced by Brave New Foundation.

Season 2 of In their Boots began airing on PBS stations in July 2010.

== List of episodes ==
Title	Original release date
"Broken Promise"	June 28, 2010
Three Iraq war veterans suffering from physical and emotional injuries find a treatment facility that transforms their lives.
"From War to Prison"	July 5, 2010
An Iraq war veteran suffering from post-traumatic stress disorder faces a trial for firing a gun on a Florida street.
"Fractured Minds"	July 12, 2010
Four soldiers suffering from traumatic brain injuries learn to navigate the road to recovery.
"Silent Partners"	July 19, 2010
Three same-sex partners of deployed service members are denied certain benefits.
"Second Battle"	July 26, 2010
The wives of two U.S. service members face deportation.
"Outside the Wire"	August 2, 2010
Three female soldiers return from Iraq and Afghanistan seeking treatment for their wartime injuries.
"Clarksville"	August 9, 2010
Relations between the community of Clarksville, Tenn., and the army base at Fort Campbell.
"Soldiers on the Street"	August 16, 2010
Two Iraq War veterans find work upon their return from Iraq, but have trouble holding the jobs.
"My Mom's a Soldier"	August 23, 2010
Eight children from three different families deal with their mothers' deployment to Iraq.
"Vets for Hire"	August 30, 2010
Three skilled veterans have trouble finding jobs upon their return from Iraq and Afghanistan.
