= Governor Ames =

Coordinates: 35.727°N 75.340°W

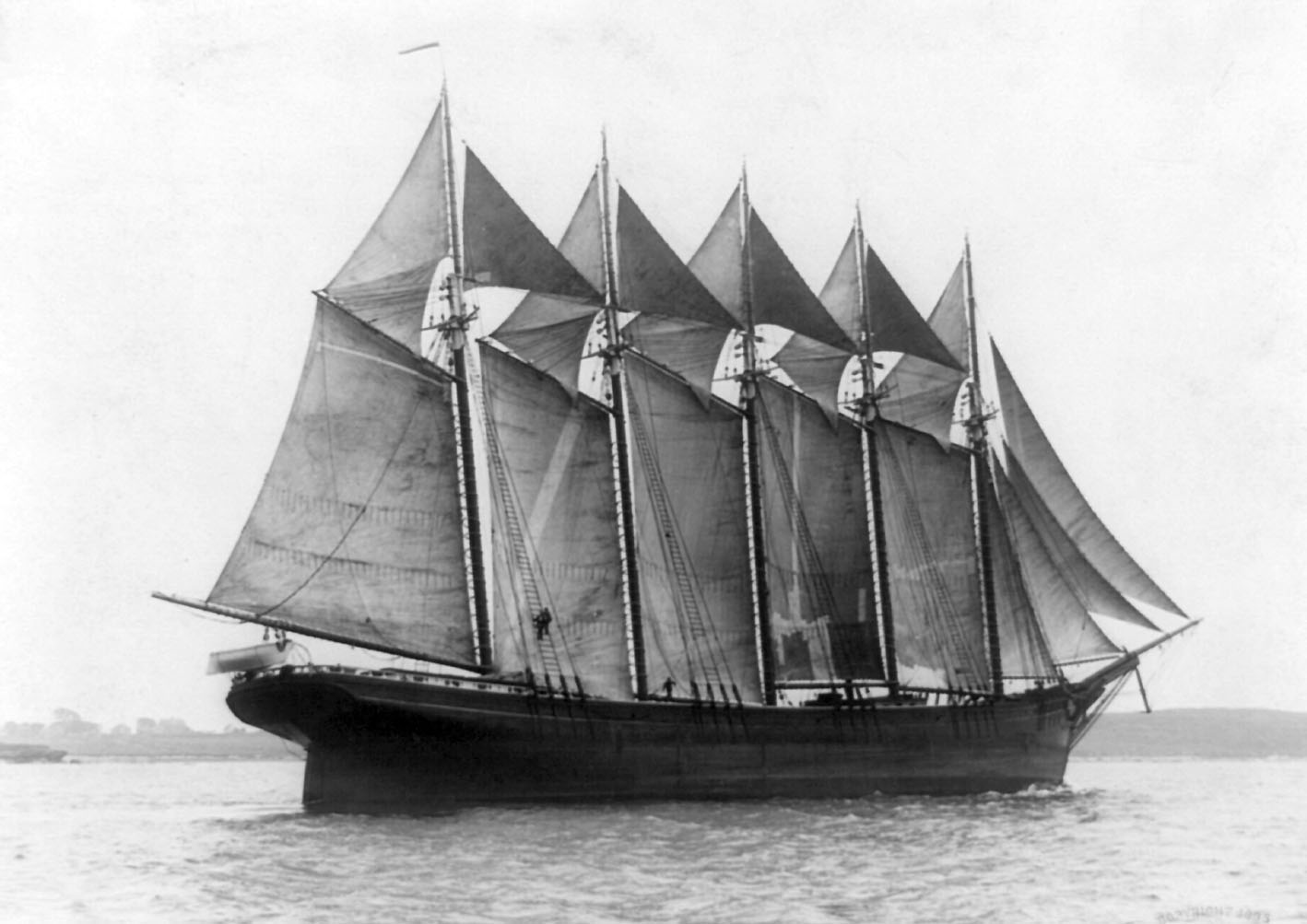
- The Governor Ames

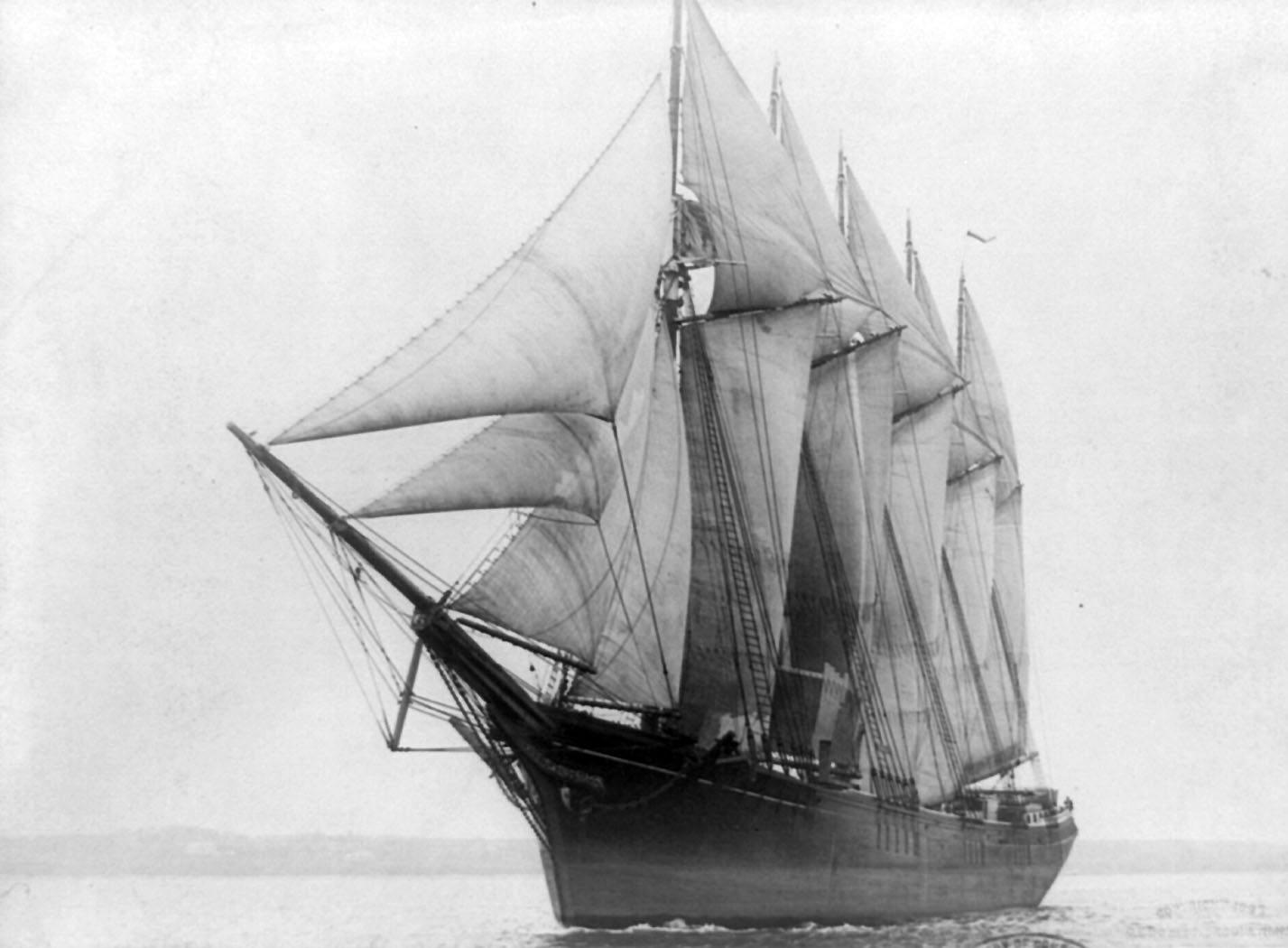
- Another view of the Governor Ames

History

United States
- Namesake: Oliver Ames
- Builder: Leavitt-Storer Shipyard, Waldoboro, Maine
- Cost: $75,000
- Launched: December 1, 1888
- Fate: Wrecked off Cape Hatteras, December 13, 1909

General characteristics
- Tonnage: 1,690 tons
- Length: 265 ft (81 m)
- Beam: 50 ft (15 m)
- Draught: 20 ft (6.1 m)

The Governor Ames was the first five-masted schooner. In the late 19th century, she was the world's largest cargo vessel.

She was launched on December 1, 1888, by the Leavitt-Storer shipyard of Waldoboro, Maine, United States, and was named for Oliver Ames (then the Governor of Massachusetts). The Governor Ames was owned and operated by the Atlantic Shipping Company based in Somerset, Massachusetts.

Although the Governor Ames was the first five-masted schooner, she was preceded by the five-masted Great Lakes barkentine David Dows, which was confusingly called a schooner despite having a square-rigged foremast. The David Dows was longer than the Governor Ames but otherwise smaller.

The schooner's first voyage, in ballast to Baltimore, Maryland, resulted in disaster on December 11, 1888, when the foremast snapped in high winds, taking the other masts with it and dismasting the Governor Ames completely. The anchor chain also broke, and the schooner ran aground on Georges Bank.

Refloated and towed to port, the vessel was remasted with shorter masts, following which it sailed from Maine to Buenos Aires in Argentina with a cargo of 1,896,000 board feet (4,470 m^{3}) of spruce and pine lumber valued at $29,868, believed to be the largest or second largest cargo ever taken by an American vessel at the time.

The lumber trade proving profitable, she was employed for the next five years in that trade, venturing far away from the Eastern seaboard and its coal trade for which she was built. She rounded Cape Horn to bring lumber to Redondo Beach, California, and was then employed hauling lumber from Pacific ports to Australia. Returning to the waters of the Eastern United States via Cape Horn once more, she entered the coal trade finally in Fall 1894.

On May 30, 1899, the Governor Ames grounded in eighteen feet of water near Key West, Florida. With assistance from the tug Childs and other schooners and the jettisoning of 200 short tons (180 t) of coal, the Governor Ames was refloated the next afternoon without major damage.

The Governor Ames was wrecked in a gale on December 13, 1909, four miles off Cape Hatteras on the North Carolina coast, having sailed on December 9 from Brunswick, Georgia, bound for New York with a cargo of railroad ties piled high on her deck. The schooner was driven onto Wimble Shoals and broke up within two hours. Thirteen of the fourteen aboard perished, including the master, Captain King, and his wife. The sole survivor was one Joseph Speering of New York.
