= San Marcos Daily Record =

Newspaper serving community in Texas, US

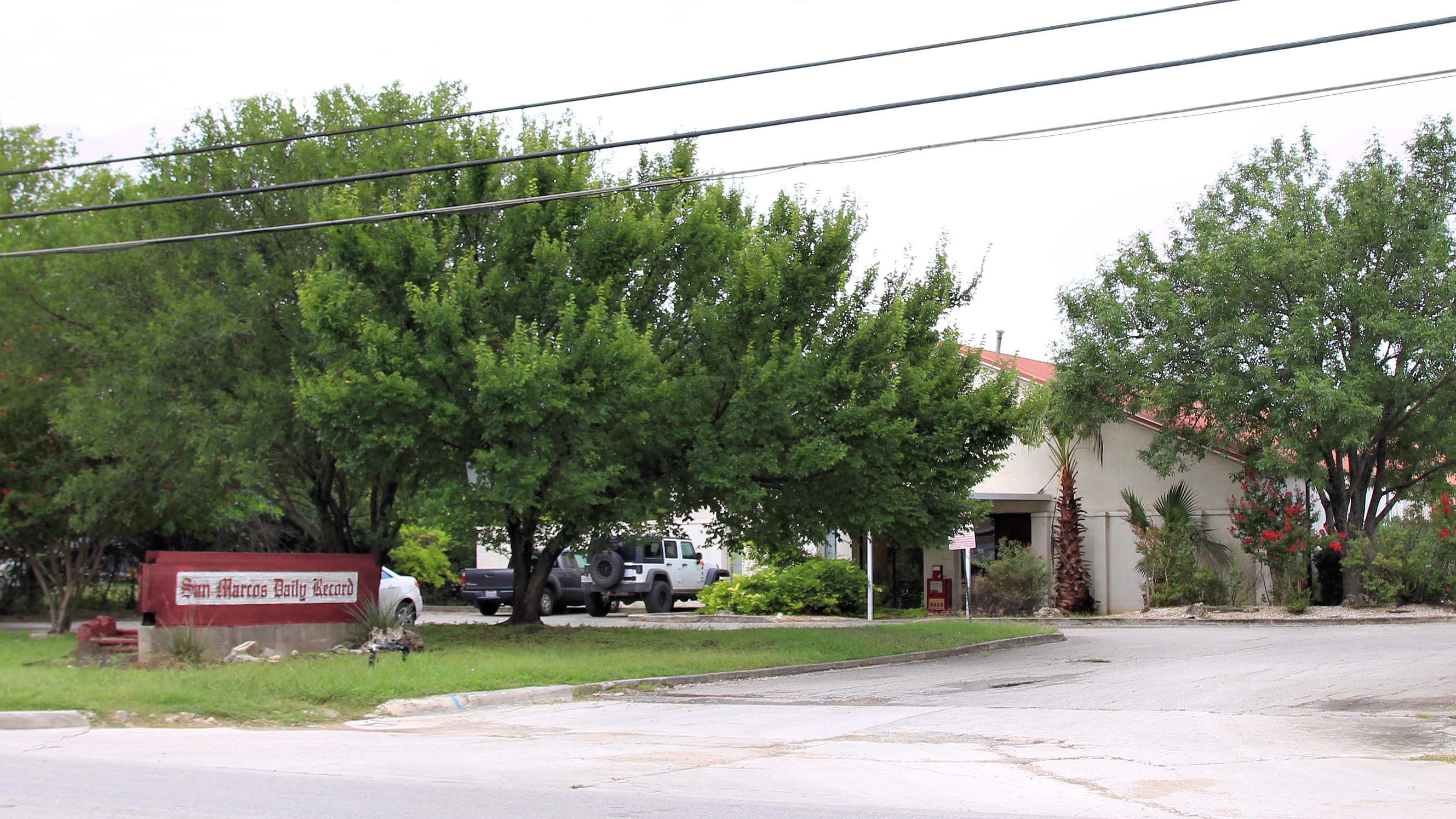
- San Marcos Daily Record former headquarters
- Type: Semi-weekly newspaper
- Format: Broadsheet
- Owner: Times Media Group
- Editor: Dalton Sweat
- Founded: 1912
- Language: English
- Headquarters: 2575 Interstate 35 North; San Marcos, Texas 78666 USA
- Circulation: 2,824 (as of 2023)
- Website: sanmarcosrecord.com

The San Marcos Daily Record is a semi-weekly newspaper published in San Marcos, Texas, on Wednesday and Sunday. It is owned by Times Media Group. The Record absorbed the Hays County Citizen on July 6, 1978. The paper also publishes a 1,500-circulation Wednesday weekly newspaper, the Hill Country Record.

In November 2024, the newspaper announced moving forward it will only publish print editions on Wednesday, Fridays and Sundays.

In 2026, the Record transitioned from a triweekly newspaper to a semi-weekly newspaper, printing on Wednesday and Sunday.
