= VET Tv =

- Country: United States
- Headquarters: San Diego, California

Programming
- Language: English

Ownership
- Key people: John Acevedo (CEO); Justice F. W. Pelton (VP of Production)

History
- Launched: 23 June 2017
- Founder: Donny O'Malley

Links
- Website: veterantv.com

Veteran Entertainment Television, more commonly referenced as VET Tv, is an American vertically integrated over-the-top (OTT) media service that specializes in producing and distributing military comedy films and television series whose primary audience is the military and veteran community. VET Tv was founded by Donny O'Malley in June 2016 and is based in San Diego, California.

== History ==
Prior to VET Tv, Donny O'Malley wrote the best seller, "Embarrassing Confessions of a Marine Lieutenant" and started Irreverent Warriors, a non-profit designated as a 501(c)(3) tax-exempt organization by the Internal Revenue Service. O'Malley created original home-made videos to market both ventures and saw an opportunity to create a film production company after receiving feedback from his audience that they would pay for his content.

In July 2016, Donny O'Malley founded VET Tv and based it on the idea of producing micro-budget films made specifically for the veteran and military community "using pitch-black comedy as a tool for processing the horrors of war." O'Malley claims, "There is tangible proof that healing from the trauma of war can be achieved through comedy." This was O'Malley's goal when he created VET Tv.

VET Tv was first conceptualized in May 2016 and on October 12, 2016, VET Tv launched a crowdfunding campaign on Kickstarter with a goal of $250,000. After 35 days and with the support of 3,609 backers, the campaign raised $296,331, becoming the third highest funded campaign in the Comedy Category, behind Mystery Science Theater 3000 and Flight of the Conchords.

The company, described as a "ragtag team of aspiring filmmakers", launched the OTT platform on June 23, 2017.

In 2023 O'Malley sold the company to John Acevedo.

== Programming ==
In June 2018, VICE investigated VET Tv's mission and audience with interviews of actual veterans as well as a documentary.

During the COVID pandemic there was a 20% increase in veteran suicides. O'Malley discussed in a television interview with KSNV Las Vegas how VET Tv aims to connect with veterans to reduce the effects of isolation due to the pandemic.

VET Tv has also used its programming to point out flaws in the military. In June 2021, V for Valor debuted, a satire which criticizes the military's broken award system.

== Filmography ==
List of VET Tv's original television series:

- Kill, Die, Laugh (2017)
- The Let Down (2017)
- A Grunt's Life (2017)
- Department of Offense (2018)
- Meanwhile, in the Barracks (2018)
- Kill, Die, Laugh 2.0 (2018)
- The Shop (2018)
- Checkpoint Charlie (2019)
- Drunken Debriefs (2019)
- Recruiters: Mission First (2019)
- Team BAMF (2019)
- Combat Sports Network (2019)
- The Bet (2019)
- Checkpoint Charlie 2.0 (2019)
- Kill, Die, Laugh 3.0 (2019)
- Meanwhile, in the Barracks 2.0 (2019)
- Devil Docs (2020)
- Mandatory Fun (2020)
- Drone Boys (2020)
- Troops Gone Wild (2020)
- Veterans Laughing Together (2020)
- Meanwhile, in the Field (2020)
- Off to See the Wizard (2020)
- Now Serving (2020)
- Marked (2020)
- Mental Hell and Wellness (2020)
- Troops Gone Wild 2.0 (2021)
- Tactical Operation Center (2021)
- V for Valor (2021)
- Recruiters: Mission First 2.0 (2021)
- Let's Talk About the War (2021)
- A Grunt's Life 2.0 (2022)
- Noncommissioned News (2022)
- Fire For Effect (2023)
- Drill (2024)
- Embed Actual (2024)
- Night Visions (2025)
- Rangers Lead the Way (2025)
- BattleLab (2025)
- E4 Mafia (2025)
- BattleLab 2.0 (2026)
- War Virgins (2026)
- BattleLab 3.0 (2026)
- Recruit Training (Post Production)
