= Down Easter (ship) =

19th-century sailing ship

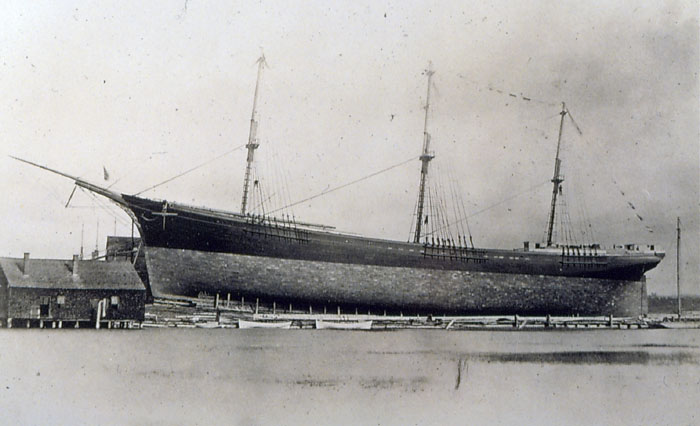
Launch of the Down Easter ship, 1884

The Down Easter or Downeaster was a type of 19th-century sailing ship built in Maine, and used largely in the California grain trade. It was a modification of the clipper ship using a similar bow but with better cargo handling. It achieved a balance between speed and tonnage such that it made the wheat trade between California and Great Britain competitive with East Coast grain trade via steamship. It could make the trip between San Francisco and Liverpool in 100 days, despite rounding Cape Horn and crossing the equator twice.

== History ==
Arthur Sewall had begun building very large Down Easters in 1869. Beginning with the launch of the Rappahannock, they built a series of 300 foot, 3,000 tonners. The Rappahannock was a full-rigged 3-masted ship, and the Sewalls realized that at this size a fourth mast was needed to make the rig manageable. Subsequent vessels were rigged as 4-masted barks, with a fore-and-aft rigged fourth mast. These were at the limit of wooden ship size, and for this reason they switched to the British practice of building with steel. The after mast was called the jigger, and since it was fore-and-aft rigged like a bark's mizzen, these vessels were commonly called four masted barks. The history of the name Downeaster derives from the fact that these ships were designed for trade between Maine and Boston where the ships generally sailed downwind and easterly on the trip to Maine.

== Other uses ==
"Downeaster" may also refer to a sailboat built by the Downeast company, or a power boat built in the Down East style. Billy Joel composed the song "The Downeaster Alexa" in reference to a Down East-style commercial fishing vessel.

== See also ==
- Great Republic (1853 clipper)
- Clipper
