= Susannah Emory =

- Born: 1740s Great Tellico, Old Cherokee Nation (now in Monroe County, Tennessee)
- Died: 1797–1800; Tugaloo River Region, Old Cherokee Nation (now in White County, Georgia)
- Other names: Susannah Fields, Susannah Martin

Susannah Emory (after 1741 – 1797–1800) was a Cherokee matriarch. She was born in the Cherokee country at Great Tellico, now located in Monroe County, Tennessee. Her family was displaced frequently because of various wars that took place on the frontier, but she was known to have been friendly to White settlers. Married three times, her descendants include many notable Cherokee leaders.

== Early life and family ==
Susannah Emory was likely born in the 1740s, (Note: Dayna Bowker Lee and Hiram F. Gregory stated "according to numerous genealogy websites, Susannah Emory was born in 1749 in the Cherokee Nation". As her first child was born between 1756 and 1760, an earlier birth date is probable. Susannah would have been seven to eleven years old, and at the time, the onset of menarche averaged 14 years, and was rare "before age twelve". (Pediatric physician from Athens, Anastasios Papadimitriou, stated that in the "second half of the 18th century the age at menarche was between 15 and 16 years".) Similarly, Cox states that her mother was born in 1726, which would make it likely that her first child was born after 1740.) in the Old Cherokee Nation at Great Tellico, now located in Monroe County, Tennessee near Tellico Plains. Cherokee society was both matrilineal and matrilocal, meaning that kinship ties came only through the mother and the family lived in the home of the mother, or her extended family. Children acquired the same clan as their mother. Marriage between members of the same clan was forbidden, which meant that fathers were not considered to be related to their children. The role that fathers played in European families was performed by maternal uncles. Husbands and unmarried children lived with the wife and mother. Upon marriage, sons moved to their wife's residence. Emory is widely reported to be one-quarter Cherokee and the granddaughter of Ludovick Grant. Grant was transported from Liverpool to South Carolina aboard the ship Susannah in 1716, for participation in the Jacobite rising of 1715. He wrote in a report dated January 12, 1756, to the governor of South Carolina, that he moved into the Cherokee Country about 1726. Grant settled in Overhill Cherokee community of Great Tellico and worked as a trader for the Cherokee, and, through the 1740s, as the liaison between the Overhill Cherokee and James Glen, colonial governor of South Carolina.

Cherokee historian and physician Emmet Starr, wrote that Grant married a woman he did not name of the Long Hair Clan. Native American Studies professor Colin G. Calloway stated that Grant's wife was named Eughioote and that she belonged to the Long Hair Clan. (Note: Writer Pamela White gave the name as Euighootee.) Donald N. Yates, historian and DNA investigator called Grant's wife Elizabeth Tassel and stated that she and Grant married around 1726. Brent Alan Cox's brief biography of Grant's wife Eughioote states that she was born around 1706 in the Overhills, that her parents may have been Kayanteehee and Corn Tassell, and that she had been identified by other historians as both Elizabeth Coody or Elizabeth Tassel. According to Starr, the daughter of Grant, whom he did not name, married an Englishman, William Emory. Historian Patricia W. Lockwood stated that the daughter was sometimes referred to as Mary Grant. Yates and Cox both stated that the only daughter of Grant and Eughioote was named Mary, (Note: Don Grant, a genealogist for Clan Grant stated that the Grants had an older daughter named Susannah Catherine, who married Robert Emory a brother of William Emory and that their parents were John Emory and Sarah Wilson from England. He gave a death for Catherine as October 22, 1769, and stated that she was buried in St. Philip's Church yard. John Amory and his wife Sarah came to Georgia from Boston, Lincolnshire, England with their three children and two servants. They arrived in Georgia in January 1737/8. (The conversion from the Julian to Gregorian calendar, which changed the beginning of the year from March 25 to January 1, did not occur in Britain and its colonies until January 1, 1752.) John and Sarah left in November with their three children, Sarah, John, and Will, relocating to Charles Town, South Carolina. By 1741, they were living at New-Market Plantation, located one mile from Charles Town. Salley's transcription of the 1720–1758 register for St. Philip's lists a burial for John Amory on October 5, 1746; a marriage for the spinster, a never married woman, Sarah Amory to William Elders in 1747; and a marriage for Sarah Amory to Mungo Graham in 1749. Smith and Salley's transcription of the 1754–1810 register for St. Philip's shows Catherine Emery was buried on October 22, 1769, and Mary Emery of Goose Creek was buried November 21, 1769. William Amory is listed as being buried on July 31, 1770. (There is no other information given in the record except a name and burial date.) No obituary could be found for Catherine, but an obituary of the same week as the burial shows that Mary Amory, wife of John, died in November 1769. A notice for the sale of William Amory's estate appeared in the South-Carolina Gazette and Country Journal in October 1770, and a death notice for John Amory appeared in The South-Carolina and American General Gazette on July 25, 1770. There was a Jonathan Amory who lived in Charles Town, but died in 1699. He was survived by a wife named Martha and children Thomas, Robert, Sarah, Ann. The only Robert Emory listed in the South Carolina Documents relating to Indian Affairs, 1750–1754, 1754–1760, 1762–1765, appears once, when he was licensed in 1750.) and Cox puts her birth at around 1726. Starr listed three children for William Emory and his wife: Mary, who married Rim Fawling and later Ezekial Buffington; Elizabeth, who married Robert Due and then John Rogers; and Susannah, who married Captain John Stuart, Richard Fields, and Joseph Martin. (Note: Genealogist Don Grant stated that Susannah Catherine, who married Robert Emory, was the mother of Susannah Emory, who became the mother of Bushyhead and John Jolly. He also stated that Mary Grant married William Emory and died in 1765 after having six children, Will (b. 1744), Mary (b. 1746), Elizabeth (b. 1748), Susannah (b. 1750), who married Richard Fields and John Martin, Drury (b. 1755), and Abraham (b. 1757). This conflicts with historians, such as Starr, Calloway, and John Bartlett Meserve, who specify William as the father of Bushyhead's mother. And, those like Starr, Meserve, Lockwood, and Elizabeth Arnett Fields, a researcher at the South Carolina Institute of Archaeology and Anthropology, who list Bushyhead's mother as the same woman who later married Fields and Martin. None of the historians consulted list Will, Drury, or Abraham, as children of William and Mary, and only Fields makes a vague reference that Susannah had "brothers". The source of Will Emory being a son of William Emory might be Larry Petrisky, who posted numerous genealogical texts on the web circa 2000, and wrote "It is possible that Will Emory was the son of Indian trader John Amory – father of William Emory – but the simpler construction is that he was Will Emory Jr". Meserve states that John Jolly was the brother of Jennie Due, a daughter of Elizabeth Emory. Oklahoma historian Grant Foreman identified Jolly as the brother of Tahlonteeskee.)

== Marriages ==
=== John Stuart ===
In 1751, Grant was assigned to supervise the traders in the Valley Towns along the Hiwassee River, and relocated his residence to Tomotley. Fields points out that it would have been unlikely for a wife and children to follow a husband in a move, as they would have lost the protection of their clan. She says a "more logical explanation" is that Emory's kinship group moved there first. John Stuart arrived in Tomotley in the fall of 1756. His company was tasked with selecting a site and building Fort Loudoun to protect Cherokee women and children in times of war. As they controlled food production, the Cherokee women who lived near the fort provided the soldiers garrisoned there with food. According to numerous historians, sometime after Stuart's arrival he had a child, known as "Oo-na-du-ta or Bushyhead", with Susannah. Sometimes the couple were described as married, while others describe Susannah as Stuart's consort. Cherokee women had sexual freedom to select their partners as long as they did not violate the rules against incest within a clan and there were no taboos against unmarried women having sex or having children.

John Richard Alden, who wrote a book about Captain Stuart, stated that the marriage was Cherokee legend and that he found no contemporary records from the eighteenth century of the union of Stuart and Emory. However, he also admitted that he was unable to uncover Stuart's European wife Sarah's surname or their marriage record either. (Note: According to Alden, Stuart's European wife was named Sarah and they four children: Sarah Christina (b. 1750), Christina (b. 1752), a daughter who died as a child, and John Joseph (b. 1757). Calloway said Stuart's wife was Scottish.) According to Leah Leneman, a social historian, until the twentieth century, Scottish law recognized "marriage by mutual consent" and required no ceremony or certificate. Alden acknowledged that Stuart likely had relationships with Native women, (Note: Per Alden, a letter written to Captain Stuart by Alexander Cameron on November 8, 1775, indicated that Stuart had relationships with Native women. The letter said that Cameron had been helped over the summer by a Native woman who was related to Hugh Hamilton's wife Savingah, the Wolf's daughter, "or your friend Bett". Friend was underlined in Alden's note #70. (It is unclear if the emphasis was in the original letter, or added by Alden.)) but said he found no record of a son called Oo-na-du-ta or Bushyhead and called it "curious" that a son of Stuart would have remained with the Cherokee. Under Scottish law, even after adultery was decriminalized in 1709, bigamy remained a crime, (Note: Until 1709, notorious adultery, an adulterous relationship in which a child was conceived, was punishable by death in Scotland.) and an illegitimate child had no legal relationship with their father or his family.

Ineffective leadership and diplomacy, combined with settlers intruding into Cherokee territory, led to Cherokee attacks on forts in the Carolinas, Georgia, and Virginia in 1760. Cherokee women warned the commanders of Fort Loudoun of the French and Indian plans to attack the British. The fort was attacked by Standing Turkey and his warriors in March 1760 and the siege continued until August, when Stuart and James Anderson negotiated terms to surrender with the Cherokee chiefs. Stuart returned to Charles Town, which would have dissolved the partnership he had with Susannah. Removal by a man of his belongings from his wife's home, or placing a husband's belongings outside a wife's dwelling by the woman, ended their relationship. After failing to secure several appointments in 1761, Stuart became the British superintendent of Indian affairs for the southern district of North America, and died in Florida in 1779. Susannah's son Oo-na-du-ta married a Scottish-Cherokee woman named Nancy Foreman. Writer Carla Toney stated that Bushyhead and his cousin, John Rogers, son of Elizabeth Emory, were part of the Chickamauga Cherokee, who remained loyalists and resisted the American forces during the American Revolutionary War. Bushyhead died in Georgia prior to the Trail of Tears, but Nancy made the trek to Indian Territory with her sons in 1838–1839.

=== Fields ===
In retaliation for the Cherokee's successful conquest of Fort Loudoun, Jeffrey Amerst, commander of the British forces in North America, and William Bull, South Carolina's lieutenant governor, planned a raid on the Cherokee country aimed at destroying their food supplies. Cherokee survivors were pushed south to seek shelter among the upper towns of Muscogee Nation. Grant's last known letter to Governor Glen was sent from Estatoe, (Note: It is unclear if Grant was living there. A colleague in the Cherokee trade, James Beamer, had operated a trading post there since around 1728,) in the Lower Towns, located on the Tugaloo River. The town was destroyed and burned in 1760 by Colonel Montgomery, who sent his report to the lieutenant governor describing the destruction of 200 houses in Estatoe and Sugar Town. Writer David H. Corkran places Grant at Cheoah (also known as Cheowee or Cheowa). Fields stated that the family likely stayed in this area, as Susannah's children from her third marriage were born in the region around the Tugaloo River in what is now located in Habersham and White Counties of Georgia. By 1762, almost all of the towns east of the Appalachian Mountains had been destroyed during the Anglo-Cherokee War. The end of hostilities left multitudes of families displaced and a lawless frontier, where thieves and vagabonds perpetrated crimes, which became "by the summer of 1766, a major crime wave".

Numerous historians agree that Susannah's second husband was Richard Fields, with whom she had seven children: Richard Jr., George, Lucy, John, Turtle, Thomas, and Susannah. (Note: Starr states that the youngest children, Thomas and Susannah were twins.) Fields (sometimes recorded as Field) was English, and worked in the Cherokee trade. He served as a witness to a land cessation along the Broad River of Georgia, which was drawn in Chota in 1771, between traders and eight sachem and warriors to settle their trade debts. In 1777, Fields was paid for bringing horses from the Cherokee to the Virginia militia. He was working as an armorer for the Cherokee in 1778, and his pay of £60 was requested from the Virginia Governor's Council by the Indian agent, Joseph Martin. Susannah was "uniformly friendly to the white people from the commencement of the revolutionary war" and warned them when they might be in danger, according to Judge David Campbell of Tennessee. Richard Jr., who was born around 1762, moved to Texas around 1820, became the chief of the Texas Cherokee and served until his death in 1827, when he was ordered to be killed by The Bowl. George fought in the Cherokee auxiliary under Andrew Jackson in the Creek War of 1813–1814. He participated in the Battle of Horseshoe Bend. He migrated to Indian Territory and lived in the Saline district. His death on April 14, 1849, was reported in the Cherokee Advocate and The Evening Post. Lucy married twice, first to Daniel McCoy and then to James Harris. Turtle served as a soldier in the Creek War, and became a Methodist preacher in 1826. Turtle was one of the signers of the Cherokee Constitution of 1839, and a member of the Cherokee Council in 1840. The youngest daughter, Susannah, married George Brewer, and later Thomas Foreman.

=== Martin ===
Starr identified Susannah's third husband as Joseph Martin, the general and Indian agent who had employed Susannah's second husband. Lockwood confirmed that for a century, Joseph was considered by most historians to be Susannah's third husband, until research in the late 1990s, showed Joseph was Susannah's brother-in-law. (Note: Field and Smith stated that the obituary of Susannah's grandson, (Joseph L. Martin) which appeared in the Cherokee Advocate on November 18, 1891, was the likely source of the incorrect identification. They further explained that two letters written to Georgia governor, George R. Gilmer in 1831 provided the statements that John Martin Jr.'s father was the brother of Joseph, the Indian agent, and the other letter stated John Jr. had the same name as his father.) Joseph was appointed as Indian agent in 1777 by Patrick Henry, a founding father and the Governor of Virginia. By 1780, Joseph's brother John (also known as Jack) was serving as a trader in the Cherokee country and living in the Overhill Towns. According to Lockwood, Susannah and John married in either 1781 or 1782, and settled in Coyotee town (also Coyatee), located twenty miles below Chota. Her children from her prior marriage to Fields lived with the couple at Coyatee. Lockwood believed the family moved to the Tugaloo region, along the Unicoi Trail which ran west from the Tugaloo River to the head of the Chattahoochee River, and settled in the Nacoochee Valley, now in White County, Georgia, around 1789. Fields thinks the family lived in the Nacoochee Valley when John Jr. was born based on a letter from Samuel Wales to Governor Gilmer, dated August 30, 1831, stating that John Jr. was born in Habersham County, Georgia, which at the time it was written included White County. The couple had three children: Nancy, John Jr., and Rachel. Nancy was the oldest child and married Jeter Lynch. After their parents died, she raised her younger siblings, (Note: Jack died "when he [John Jr.] was almost grown", which Fields says was probably in 1801 or 1802. Susannah predeceased Jack.) and her eight children with Lynch. John Jr.'s birth date is listed on his tombstone as October 20, 1784. (Note: Where John Jr. was born is unclear. Fields said it was likely he was born in the Tugaloo region. Lockwood postulated that all of the children were born in Coyatee because a letter from Joseph to Patrick Henry written in 1786, and a narrative on Campbell's Station by David Campbell written in 1829 state that the family were in Coyatee in 1786, 1787, and 1788.) He served as a Cherokee Constitutional Convention delegate in 1827 at New Echota, was the first treasurer of the Cherokee Nation, and "first Chief Justice of the first supreme court ever instituted in the Cherokee Nation". He removed to Indian Territory and died on October 17, 1840, near Fort Gibson, where he was buried. The youngest daughter was Rachel, who was born on March 1, 1788, and married Daniel Davis.

== Death and legacy ==
According to Fields, Susannah died during John Jr.'s adolescence, which Lockwood says would have been before he was sixteen. Many prominent Cherokee leaders descend from Susannah. Some of her notable descendants are:

- Jesse Bushyhead (1804–-1844), was a Baptist preacher and Chief Justice of the Cherokee Nation from 1840 to 1844.
- Dennis Wolfe Bushyhead (1826–1898), was elected twice (1879 and 1883) and served eight years as Principal Chief of the Cherokees.
- William Penn Adair (1830–1880), served as a senator, Supreme Court Justice, and assistant Principal Chief for the Cherokee nation.
- Edward Wilkerson Bushyhead, known as Ned (1832–1907), was a newspaperman, miner, and lawman, who served as sheriff and police chief of San Diego, California in the 1870s and 1880s.
- Carrie Bushyhead Quarles (1834–1909), was a teacher in the Cherokee public school system from 1856–1893.
- Lucian Burr Bell (1838–1915), known as Hooley, served with Stand Watie's confederate troops, was clerk of the Cherokee senate three times, and served three terms (1885–1891) as the senator for the Delaware District of the Cherokee Nation.
- Eliza Bushyhead Alberty (1839–1909), was a teacher and in 1885 became the owner/operator of the National Hotel in Tahlequah, Indian Territory.
- Bula Croker (1884–1957), teacher, women's suffragist, heiress and treasure hunter.
