= Carrie Bushyhead Quarles =

- Quarles in 1903
- Born: Caroline Elizabeth Bushyhead; March 17, 1834; Bradley County, Tennessee
- Died: February 23, 1909 (aged 74); Baptist, Adair County, Oklahoma
- Other names: Caroline Bushyhead, Caroline E. Bushyhead, Carrie Bushyhead, Carrie E. Bushyhead, Carrie E. Quarles, Caroline Elizabeth Bushyhead Quarles
- Occupation: teacher
- Years active: 1856–1893
- Father: Jesse Bushyhead
- Relatives: Susannah Emory (grandmother); Dennis Bushyhead (brother); Edward Wilkerson Bushyhead (brother); Eliza Bushyhead Alberty (sister)

Carrie Bushyhead Quarles (Cherokee, March 17, 1834 – February 23, 1909) was a Native American, graduated in the first class of students from the First Cherokee Female Seminary and was a teacher to Native American children for nearly forty years. Born in Tennessee to biracial parents of Cherokee and Scottish heritage, she came to Indian Territory on the Trail of Tears. She graduated in 1855 as valedictorian of the inaugural class of the Cherokee Female Seminary and began teaching at the school the following year. During her career, which lasted until 1893, she trained numerous Native American leaders, such as Alice Brown Davis, Samuel Houston Mayes, and Thomas Buffington.

When the United States government passed the Curtis Act of 1898, which forced allotments, enrollment of tribal members, and dissolution of the Cherokee government, Quarles was enrolled in the Cherokee Nation and received an allotment in Baptist, Indian Territory in 1903. All of the Cherokee living in Oklahoma had been made US citizens in 1901 and were made citizens of the State of Oklahoma in 1907. A play, Under the Cherokee Moon by Laurette Willis, which was performed annually between 2007 and 2011 at the Cherokee Heritage Center in Park Hill, Oklahoma, featured Quarles as the principal character. She told the story of the Cherokee people from their removal to the post-Civil War period.

== Early life and education ==
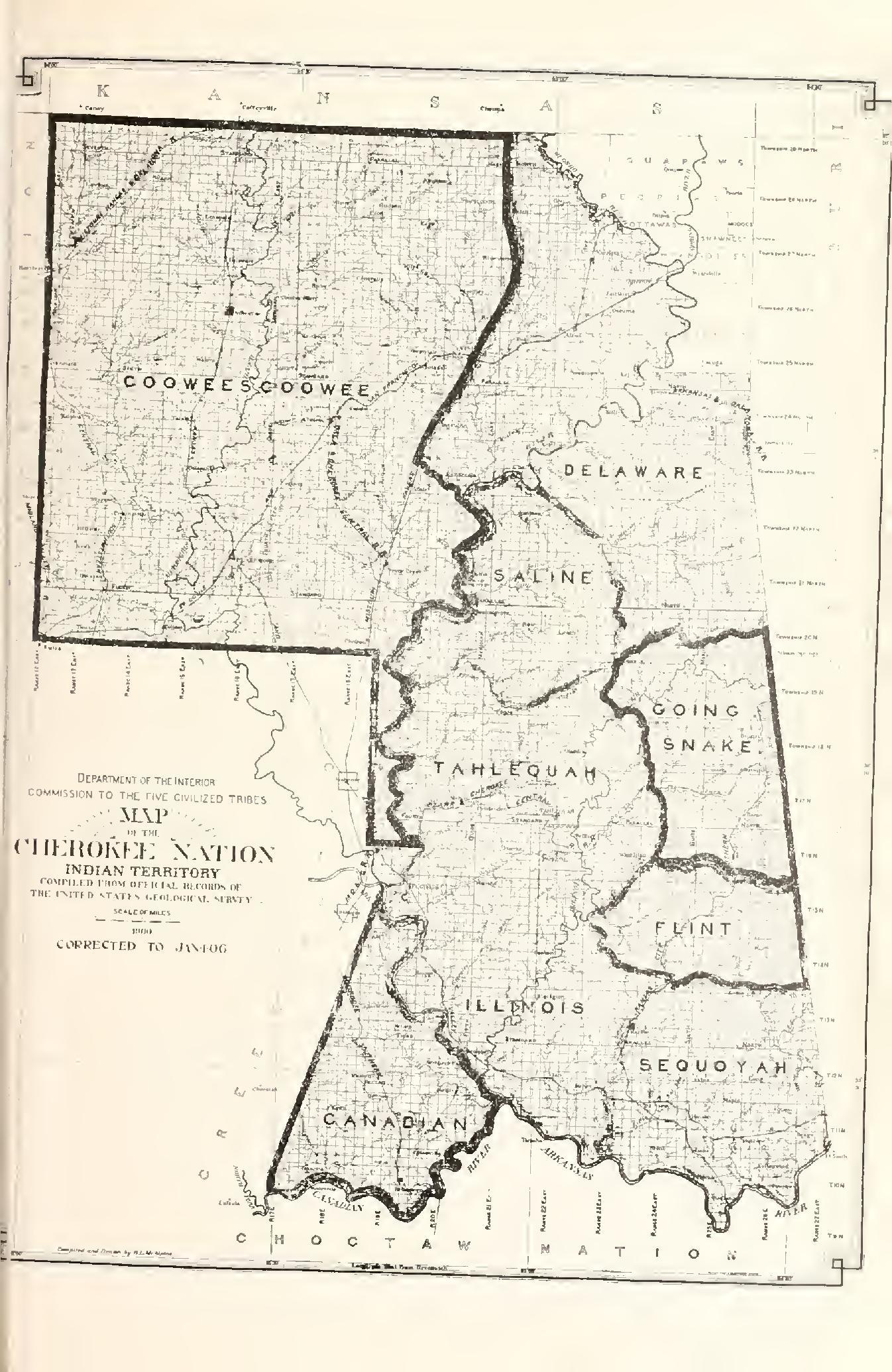
1906 map of the Going Snake and Flint Districts of the Cherokee Nation

Caroline Elizabeth "Carrie" Bushyhead was born on March 17, 1834, in Bradley County, Tennessee to Elizabeth "Eliza" (née Wilkerson, or Wilkinson, 1806–1872) and Jesse Bushyhead (1804–1844). Jesse was the son of Nancy Foreman, who was half-Cherokee and half-Scottish, and John "Oo-na-du-ta or Bushyhead", son of a Scottish Indian agent, Captain John Stuart, (Note: Historian John Richard Alden, wrote in his book about Captain Stuart, that he found no contemporary records from the eighteenth of the union of Stuart and Emory, nor about him or a son being called "Oo-na-du-ta or Bushyhead". However, Alden stated that a letter, written to Captain Stuart by Alexander Cameron on November 8, 1775, stated that Cameron had been helped over the summer by a Native woman who was related to Hugh Hamilton's wife Savingah, the Wolf's daughter, "or your friend Bett". (Friend was underlined in Alden's note #70.)) and his 1/4 Cherokee wife, Susannah Emory. Jesse was educated at Candy's Creek Mission and then taught at the mission school until around 1830. He married and had two children with his first wife. In 1833, Jesse became a Baptist preacher and served with Evan Jones as a missionary among the Cherokee and interpreter for other clergy and political leaders of his tribe. Eliza was from Georgia, half Cherokee, and a member of the wolf clan of the Cherokee Nation. Her family was prominent and owned slaves. She and Jesse had nine children: Jane (m. Drew), Dennis, Daniel, Charlotte (m. Mayes), Edward "Ned", Caroline, Eliza Missouri (m. Alberty), Jesse Jr., and Nancy Sarah (m. McNair). (Note: Elizabeth is listed on the 1851 Drennan Roll as head of a family, consisting of Dennis, Edward, Daniel, Caroline, Eliza, Jesse Jr., and Nancy in Going Snake District. Charlotte and her husband, George Washington Mayes, appear with their family in the Flint District. Jane Drew died in 1844.) Seven of the children were born in the Cherokee homeland prior to the Trail of Tears and made their way with their parents, Jesse's mother, and a party Jesse led of around one thousand Cherokee to Indian Territory in 1838. Eliza Missouri was born on the trek in January 1839 at Cape Girardeau, Missouri and the younger children were born after reaching Indian Territory.

For the first nine months in Indian Territory, the family lived in a tent about six miles from the Arkansas border, and three miles north of what is now Westville, Oklahoma, at a place initially called Bread Town, and later known as Baptist Mission or Baptist,. which was located in the Going Snake District. They built and then moved into a house, near the Baptist mission school and Nancy Foreman's home. From 1840 until his death four years later, Jesse served as Chief Justice of the Cherokee Supreme Court. All of the Bushyhead children attended the mission school, where they were taught by Sarah Hibbard. The mission school closed in 1846, and Carrie, who had decided to become a teacher, enrolled at another school located about fifteen miles south of Baptist and run by a woman, who was a missionary. That year, the Cherokee Council authorized the building of male and female seminaries to provide high school education to tribal members. Both schools were completed in 1850, and Carrie entered the Cherokee Female Seminary in Park Hill as one of its first class of students. She graduated in 1855 as the valedictorian of her class.

== Career ==
Bushyhead began her teaching career in 1856, working as an assistant teacher at the Cherokee Female Seminary and teaching at the public school in Tahlequah. In 1858, she was transferred to the rural Muddy Springs School, located in the Flint District of the Cherokee Nation, about three miles from Stilwell. She taught fifty students, which included Samuel Houston Mayes, who would become Principal Chief of the Cherokees in 1895. Her pupils had varying levels of competence in English. Although the Cherokee had their own syllabary and materials in the Cherokee language existed, secular instruction and textbooks were typically distributed in English, whereas religious instruction was provided in both Cherokee and English. Tribal funding for the schools dwindled in the lead-up to the Civil War and the public schools were closed in 1859. Her mother, Eliza, still owned one slave when the war broke out, but the Baptist church was involved with the abolition movement. For the duration of the war, Bushyhead taught at the school at Fort Gibson, a Union Army garrison. Her students at the fort included children from several other tribes, including Alice Brown Davis, who would later become the first woman to serve as Principal Chief of the Seminole Nation of Oklahoma.

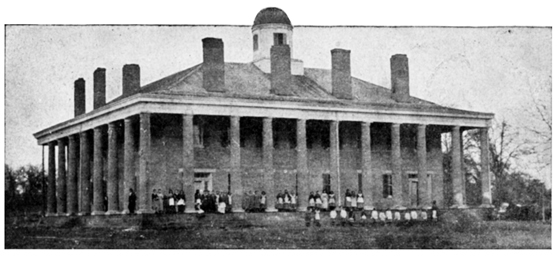
First Cherokee Female Seminary 1850–1887

The Cherokee Nation reestablished its public school system in 1867, and Bushyhead was assigned in 1868 to teach at the school in Baptist. Among her students there was Thomas Buffington, who would serve twice as the Principal Chief of the Cherokee. The Board of Education decided in 1872 to adopt a policy of bilingual education and had John Buttrick Jones, son of the missionary Evan Jones, translate the textbooks used into the Cherokee language. The educational system was changed to provide instruction in Cherokee with courses in English to assist students in becoming fluent in both languages. Bushyhead's classes continued to expand from 59 pupils in 1871 to 75 six years later. The 1870s were eventful for the Bushyhead family. Eliza Missouri married Bluford West Alberty in 1871 and they would become hoteliers in Talequah. Ned, who had moved to California, was the co-founder of The San Diego Union and would be elected to his first term as sheriff of San Diego County in 1875. Dennis was elected as treasurer of the nation in 1871 and served a four-year term, before being elected Principal Chief in 1879. Eliza died in 1872, and Bushyhead took over management of her homestead. In 1876, she married the postmaster of Baptist. Her husband, William R. Quarles, was from Cobb County, Georgia and was not a tribal member. The couple had no children of their own, but raised nine orphans. (Note: One of the orphans she raised was Mary Vann Lasley, who married Frederick Spencer Barton in 1888.) When her brother Dennis's wife died in 1882, the couple took in his children Sarah, Lizzie, and Dennis Jr. to raise. Quarles continued to teach at Baptist until 1893 and she and William were active in the church. The couple donated land for a parsonage to the church in 1895.

== Later life ==
The last years of Quarles's life were a tumultuous period for the Cherokee Nation. In 1898, the US Congress passed the Curtis Act, forcing the Five Civilized Tribes to distribute tribally held lands as individual allotments of private property. All Native people residing in Indian Territory were granted US citizenship under an act (31 Stat. 1447) of March 3, 1901. The Cherokee Nation entered an allotment agreement in 1902, which provided that each tribal citizen would receive forty acres as a homestead, which was untaxable and inalienable (ineligible to be sold) for twenty-one years, and seventy acres of surplus land which was inalienable for five years. Under terms of the Curtis Act, each tribal member was to be enrolled by the Dawes Commission. Quarles was entered on the official roll as #747, and William represented her in her application for her allotment in 1903. They asked to be granted the 85 acres which they had fenced and improved in Baptist and the adjacent land in Section 13, Township 18, Range 45. The tribal government was abolished on March 6, 1906, in preparation for uniting Indian and Oklahoma Territories into the State of Oklahoma. That year she was honored as one of the eight surviving graduates of the First Cherokee Female Seminary, which had been destroyed by fire in 1887 and was rebuilt in 1889. Oklahoma entered the union on November 17, 1907.

== Death and legacy ==
Quarles died at her home in Baptist on February 23, 1909, after having a stroke a week prior. She was buried in the cemetery at the Baptist Mission. At the time of her death, she was recognized for her commitment to her community and years of teaching. In 1917, the year that her husband died, an article in the Westville Record, "The History of Education in Adair County", named Quarles as "among the best teachers of her time". Her biographer, Marilyn Watt wrote, "Carrie Bushyhead Quarles carved a niche for herself in what was perhaps the only accepted outlet for female leadership, teaching. To have been a Cherokee teacher to Cherokee students, to have lived through the Cherokee tribe's most trying times, and to have contributed to an exemplary tribal educational system are more than adequate legacies". The Cherokee Heritage Center commissioned a revised version of the drama Under the Cherokee Moon by Laurette Willis, a non-Native writer and actor, in 2011. A longer version of the production had run annually from 2007 to 2010 at the Cherokee Heritage Center. The play was performed as an outdoor production and staged at the Adams Corner Rural Village on the site of the Heritage Center. The historical drama began with the actors dressed in period costumes engaging with the audience, and exchanging greetings. After the introduction in Cherokee and English, in both versions of the play, Willis appeared on stage as Quarles. The first act of the play featured the character of Quarles retelling her life from the Trail of Tears to the post-Antebellum period. The second part introduced the story of Sarah Worcester, a missionary who taught at the Female Seminary.
