= National Register of Historic Places listings in Adair County, Oklahoma =

Location of Adair County in Oklahoma

This is a list of the National Register of Historic Places listings in Adair County, Oklahoma.

This is intended to be a complete list of the properties on the National Register of Historic Places in Adair County, Oklahoma, United States. The locations of National Register properties for which the latitude and longitude coordinates are included below, may be seen in a map.

There are 8 properties listed on the National Register in the county.

This National Park Service list is complete through NPS recent listings posted March 27, 2026.

== Current listings ==
	Name on the Register	Image	Date listed	Location	City or town	Description
1	Adair County Courthouse	Adair County Courthouse	August 23, 1984 (#84002927)	Division St. 35°48′51″N 94°37′43″W	Stilwell	art deco courthouse built in 1930
2	Ballard Creek Roadbed		September 9, 2013 (#13000702)	Address Restricted	Westville	Part of the Cherokee Trail of Tears MPS
3	Breadtown		June 9, 2014 (#14000296)	Address Restricted	Westville	Part of the Cherokee Trail of Tears MPS
4	Buffington Hotel	Buffington Hotel	February 23, 1984 (#84002929)	Main St. 35°59′36″N 94°34′05″W	Westville	historic hotel built in 1910
5	Rev. Jesse Bushyhead Grave	Rev. Jesse Bushyhead Grave	December 6, 2004 (#04001334)	State Highway 59; 36°02′08″N 94°34′58″W	Westville	grave of Cherokee religious and political leader topped with 15-foot-tall (4.6 m) marble monument
6	Golda's Mill	Golda's Mill	November 9, 1972 (#72001049)	12 miles northwest of Stilwell; 35°51′34″N 94°45′53″W	Stilwell	water mill built in 1882 and operated until destroyed by fire in 1983
7	KCS Railway Depot	KCS Railway Depot	September 8, 2015 (#15000577)	1 S. US 59; 35°48′50″N 94°37′33″W	Stilwell	
8	Opera Block		February 23, 1984 (#84002934)	Main St. 35°59′35″N 94°34′05″W	Westville	built in 1912 and demolished in 1998

== See also ==
- List of National Historic Landmarks in Oklahoma
- National Register of Historic Places listings in Oklahoma
