= Motortrain =

American rock band

- Origin: Westville, Oklahoma, United States
- Genres: Hard rock, southern rock
- Years active: 2010–present
- Label: SlamBang
- Members: Aaron McCollum; Michael Sigulinsky; Sam Blossom; Danny Goff
- Past members: Levi Cook; Christopher Brower; Rick Grey; Allen Myrick
- Website: www.motortrainmusic.com

Motortrain is an American southern rock band, formed in 2010 in Westville, Oklahoma. They are signed to SlamBang Records. The band consists of Aaron "Ump" McCollum (lead vocals, lead guitar), Sam Blossom (rhythm guitar, backing vocals), Michael "Sig" Sigulinsky (bass guitar, backing vocals), and a rotating guest drummer. Motortrain has released one studio EP, "Straight Six".

== History ==
=== 2010: Formation ===
The band Motortrain originated in Westville, Oklahoma. Aaron "Ump" McCollum (Formerly of Phoenix, SX cowpunk band The Earps) and Christopher Brower started to play music together trying to work out the right balance between rock and roll riffs and country-tinged lyrics. They were soon joined by Michael "Sig" Sigulinsky and Levi Cook who rounded out the rhythm section. Motortrain officially formed in the fall of 2010. They immediately began writing the songs that would make up their first EP, as well as playing shows in the Fayetteville, AR and Tulsa, OK areas.

=== 2011: Motortrain - Straight Six ===
In May 2011 Motortrain signed with the independent label SlamBang Records. The band's first, EP "Straight Six" was released in August 2011. To achieve the sound the band was after, they chose to work with legendary recording house FullWell Studios in Phoenix, Arizona. They worked with producer Louis Lashes, and engineer Mike Bolenbach to produce six tracks of heavy riff-driven rock and roll which featured the singles from "Going going gone", "Backyard Brawler", and "Bad Girls". The EP was received moderately well by critics and radio stations alike, gaining the band immediate exposure in the United States.

"She’s Hot, Bad Girls, and Goin Goin Gone, can have you tapping your toes and smashing beer cans on your forehead. That latter tune is likely the best with its strong southern feel."

"What you get is simply, honest, barroom rock ’n roll."

In August 2011 Motortrain released the video for "Going Going Gone" which was produced by Rustic Pictures, and directed by Gabe Mayhan. It would later become a finalist in the Little Rock Film Festival for Best Music Video of 2011.

“You may just hear the essence of tremors emanating from that town placed right in ‘the middle of nowhere’. You see, they make them loud in Westville. “

=== 2012 ===
Motortrain continued to stay on the road into the spring of 2012 to include a southwest regional tour as well as many midwest dates. The band also made waves when their stage at Rocklahoma was cancelled and instead of letting down fans, they provided an impromptu campground performance that rivaled many of the sidestage productions. After the summer tour season the members of Motortrain retreated back to the Ozarks to begin writing and producing their next album which is anticipated to release in spring 2013.

=== 2013 ===
2013 saw some delays in the production schedule for Motortrain due to some changes in the bands' line-up. Guitarist Chris Brower left after a death in the family in late 2012 to be replaced by Rick "Red" Gray, and drummer Levi Cook departed the band for personal reasons, to be replaced by Alan "Bigz" Myrick. 2013 also brought the introduction of a fifth official member of the band, longtime roadie and guitar tech Sam Blossom. While the lineup changes may have caused a delay in production, it did nothing to slow the live show schedule. Motortrain took on two tours in 2013 as well as returning to Rocklahoma again, this time to play the Axis Entertainment stage, as well as their now-annual campground party.

In addition to live touring, 2013 brought two new Motortrain singles to radio. "Whiskey Fingers" and "Briars and Barbed Wire" from the yet unreleased self-titled album were both sent to radio in October.

== Band members ==
- Aaron "Ump" McCollum (lead vocals, guitar)
- Sam Blossom (guitar/backing vocals)
- Michael "Sig" Sigulinsky (bass guitar, backing vocals)
- Danny Goff (Drums)

== Discography ==
- Straight 6 (2011)
