= Bula Croker =

Native American activist (1884–1957)

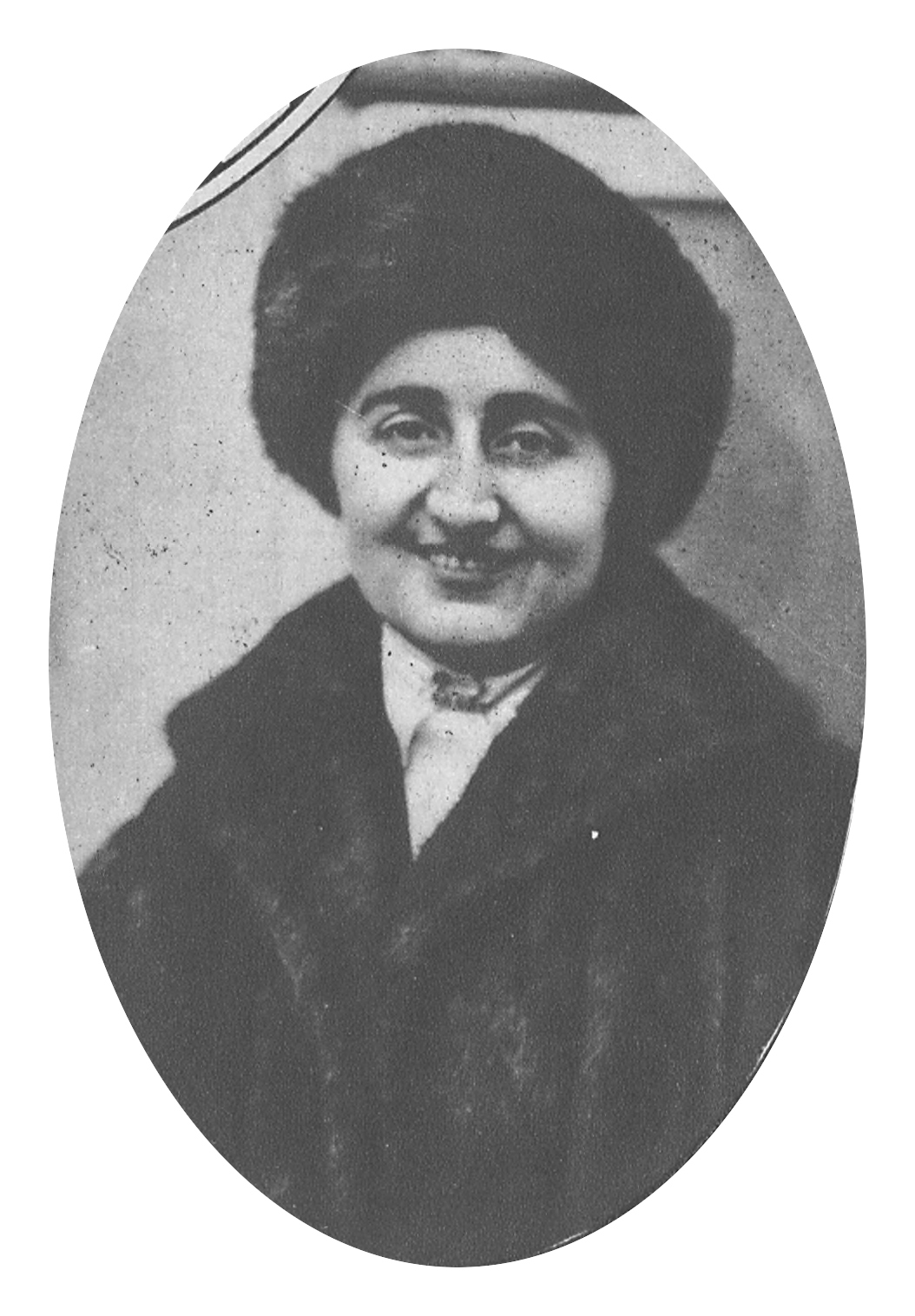
- Croker in 1919
- Born: Beulah Benton Edmondson; February 17, 1884; Beatties Prairie, Delaware District, Old Cherokee Nation, Indian Territory
- Died: March 16, 1957 (aged 73); West Palm Beach, Florida
- Other names: Bula Benton Edmondson, Beulah D. Edmondson, Bula E. Croker, Ketaw Kaluntuchy, Ketaw Kaluntchy Sequoi
- Occupations: Teacher, entertainer, treasure hunter
- Years active: 1902–1955

Bula Croker, birth name Beulah Benton Edmondson, (February 17, 1884 – March 16, 1957) was a Native American teacher and women's suffrage activist. She rode a horse while dressed in Native attire in the 1913 suffrage parades in Washington, D. C. and along New York City's Fifth Avenue. While entertaining socialites with tales of her Cherokee ancestry, she met Richard Croker, a former Tammany Hall political boss and the two quickly became engaged. They married in 1914, despite a forty-year age difference, causing three of Richard's children from his first marriage to begin a series of lawsuits that would last for over fifteen years. The children claimed that Croker was not of Cherokee ancestry and accused her of fraud, but evidence proved that she was registered on the rolls of the Cherokee Nation. They also attempted to prove, unsuccessfully, that their father was incompetent. When Richard died in 1922, he disinherited all but one of his children and left his multi-million dollar estate to Croker. The three children attempted to break the will by claiming that Croker was a bigamist. They then tried to use a Florida statute to bar her from disposing of their Palm Beach properties because the sale would violate her right to dower and their right to inherit. In each claim, Croker eventually prevailed; however, the string of lawsuits, costs associated with her defense, and delays on being able to sell the properties, led her to file bankruptcy in 1937.

Croker became involved in politics in the 1930s. She supported Franklin Roosevelt and progressive policies. She was reported to be the first Palm Beach resident to allow Black beach-goers to use her beach. She was appointed to Governor David Sholtz's staff in 1932, becoming one of the first women to serve as staff to a governor in Florida. Because of a dispute with the federal agency which had oversight over the Palm Beach County Emergency Relief and Civil Works Council, which she chaired, Croker and the entire civil works council were dismissed from their posts in 1933. The following year she ran unsuccessfully as a Florida representative for the United States House. In 1945, she began searching for pirate treasure and launched thirteen unsuccessful ventures over the next decade. She was often covered in the international press before her death in 1957.

== Early life and education ==
Beulah Benton Edmondson was born on February 17, 1884, in Beatties Prairie, in the Delaware District, of the Old Cherokee Nation, in Indian Territory to Florence Eugenia (née Williams) and Michael Smith Edmondson. Her mother was the daughter of Louisa J. (née Stover) and Joseph Lynch Williams, granddaughter of Mary (née Lynch) and John Williams, great-granddaughter of Rachel (née Martin) and Jeter Lynch, and great-great-granddaughter of Susannah (née Emory) and John Martin. Through her mother, Beulah was 1/16th Cherokee and an enrolled as member of the tribe. Her father was a cattleman and rancher. Beulah was the youngest of three sisters, Cherokee Vashti "Cherrie" (b. 1879) and Gonia L. Edmondson (b. 1882). She attended the Cherokee public schools and graduated from the Cherokee Female Seminary near Tahlequah on May 29, 1902.

== Teacher, suffrage activist, and entertainer (1902–1914) ==
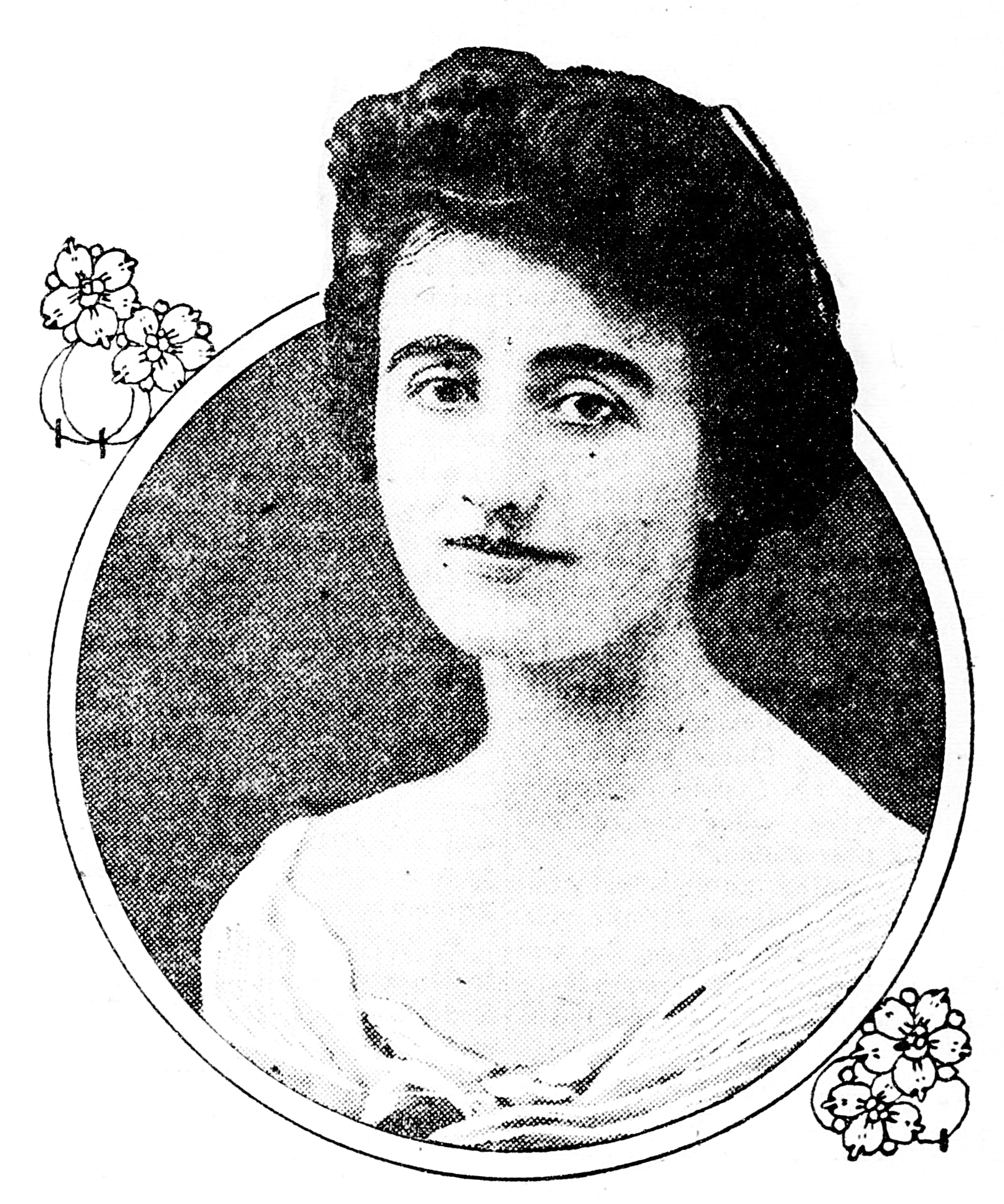
Edmondson, around 1910

After her graduation, Edmondson taught school at both the Cedar Bluff School and the Cherokee Female Seminary. In 1906, she took a course at the University of Chicago to qualify for a teaching certificate. Returning to Tahlequah she first taught mathematics and then in 1908 became principal of the Sequoyah Public School supervising eight other teachers. She attended the Boston School of Expression and upon completing her studies in 1911, opened a school to teach dramatic expression in Muskogee. Over the summers, she gave dramatic readings and took additional courses in New York City and Paris. In 1913, Edmondson planned to return to New York to take another drama course, but changed her plans for a chance to participate in the women's suffrage movement. On March 3, she rode a black horse and wore a Native costume in the suffragist's parade held in Washington, D.C. From Washington, she went to New York and on May 3, rode a piebald horse wearing Native clothes, down Fifth Avenue in the national suffrage parade, which reportedly had between 35,000 and 40,000 participants. She joined the Equal Franchise Society of New York and participated in various rallies.

Edmondson lived at the Studio Club, an artists' cooperative which had been founded by members of the Young Women's Christian Association. She began taking music and voice lessons and to pay for them, she supplemented her income from the farm on her allotment, by giving drawing-room performances that were popular with New York society. She used the stage name Ketaw Kaluntuchy, or Ketaw Kaluntchy Sequoi. She also gave lectures at girls' camps throughout New England. Dressed in costumes, she sang songs in Cherokee, and told the audience Indian legends, and performed various Cherokee dances. Many newspapers referred to her as an Indian princess, and gave fanciful heritage for her, such as writing that she created the Cherokee alphabet, that she was the daughter of "Princess Sequoyah" and granddaughter of the warrior Chief Sequoy. The Muskogee Times Democrat recognized that she was using her Cherokee ancestry as a means to "seize an opportunity to make good". Edmondson said that she never claimed to be a princess, but when newspapers invented that title, she allowed it for publicity.

== Marriage, litigation, and life abroad (1914–1930) ==
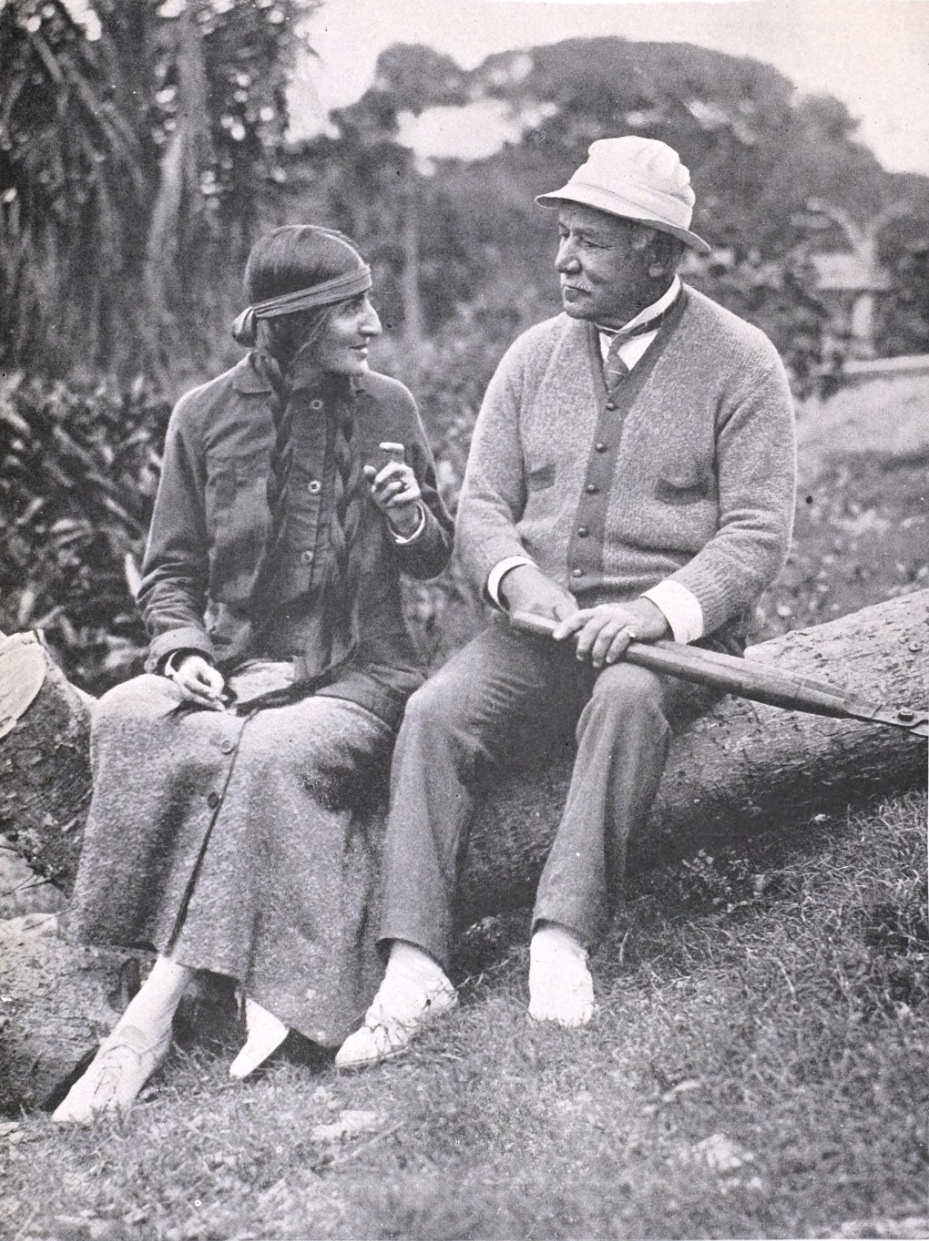
The Crokers at Glencairn in 1915

In 1914, Edmondson was introduced to former Tammany Hall political boss Richard Croker by Andrew Freedman, owner of the New York Giants and the Baltimore Orioles. Although Richard was four decades her senior, they married in November after a whirlwind courtship. (Note: Richard's first wife died in September 1914, and he proposed to Edmondson just three days after meeting her.) Her uncle, Congressman William Wirt Hastings, gave the bride away, (Note: Hastings was the son of Louisa J. Stover, Edmondson's maternal grandmother, by her second husband William Archibald Yell Hastings.) at a ceremony which was held in the home of Nathan Straus. The couple honeymooned in Palm Beach at the ocean-front property known as the "Wigwam", which Richard owned, before settling at Glencairn Castle, a property her husband owned in Stillorgan, near Dublin, Ireland. In Ireland, Richard raised racing horses, which won both the English and Irish Derbies in 1907. The couple typically lived in Ireland and wintered in Florida. When in Florida, Croker served as a colorful and active hostess, but they spent most of their time in Ireland.

Three of Richard's children from his first marriage, Richard Jr., Howard, and Ethel, (Note: Two of Richard's sons, Frank and Bertie, had died in separate accidents in 1905. His daughter Florence, the only child he did not disinherit, married an Italian count and lived in Naples.) believed that Croker had only married their father for his money. The three children sued Richard in 1915 over an inheritance from their mother. Richard proved that he had given Richard Jr. $150,000 to help him start a business and set up a trust fund that gave the other children $4,000 annually. In a 1917 letter, Richard stated that Richard Jr. was mismanaging the trust fund and failing to properly distribute the funds. In 1919, the children claimed that Croker was a fraud and was not Cherokee but was Jewish. Their lawyers said that even though the children sided with their mother when their parents separated many years before her death, Croker caused an estrangement between the children and their father. Croker was able to substantiate her Cherokee heritage with her enrollment number. The children then went to court to have Richard declared incompetent. The case continued until July 1920 when the court found Richard fully competent. His children appealed and while the appeal was pending, Richard died in 1922 and was buried on the estate at Glencairn.

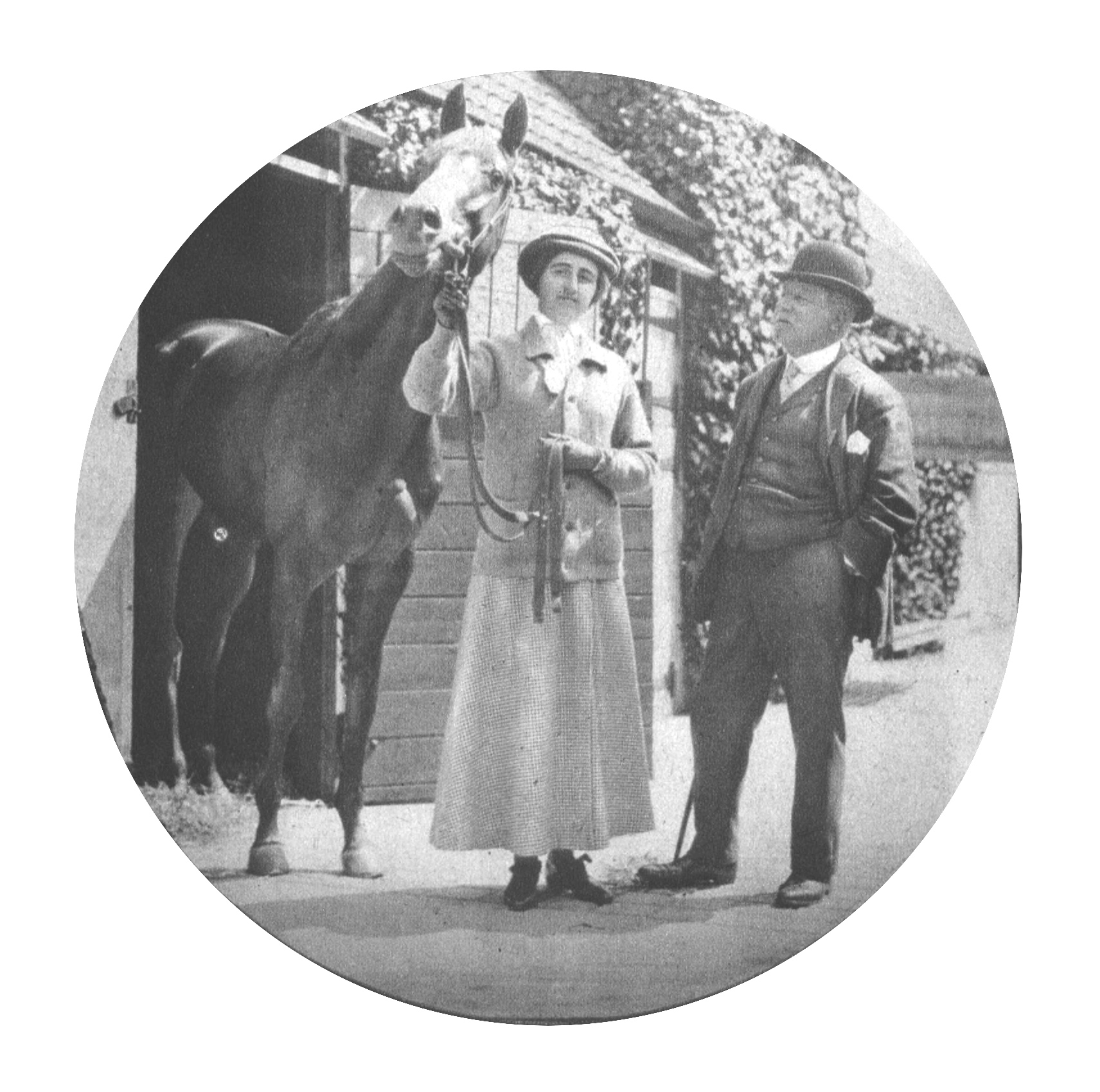
The Crokers in front of the stables at Glencairn, 1915

Upon Richard's death, Croker's parents moved into the Wigwam to act as caretakers of the Palm Beach property. Her sister Cherrie, along with her husband Robert Garrett, and their daughter, Kathleen, moved into Glencairn in 1922 to help Croker run the estate. Both Croker and Kathleen studied law at Trinity College Dublin. Croker studied to gain knowledge for the on-going litigation with her step-children. Kathleen, in 1930, became the first American woman admitted to the Bar of the Irish Free State. Richard left his estate worth several million dollars to Croker and Richard Jr., Harry, and Ethel filed suit in the Irish courts to break the will. They claimed that Croker had been a bigamist and was married in Northport, Massachusetts to a man named Guy Morone, from whom she was not divorced when she married their father. Croker's former roommate testified in Dublin that she and Bula lived together in Muskogee at the time (1912–1913) when the children claimed she was living in Massachusetts. In March 1924, Croker prevailed and was awarded the $2 million estate. The children objected, but in June a jury in Dublin ordered the probate to be settled. The children appealed, but judge R. P. Robbins of Palm Beach concurred with the Dublin decision that none of the children's 23 objections were sufficient to legally delay the settlement.

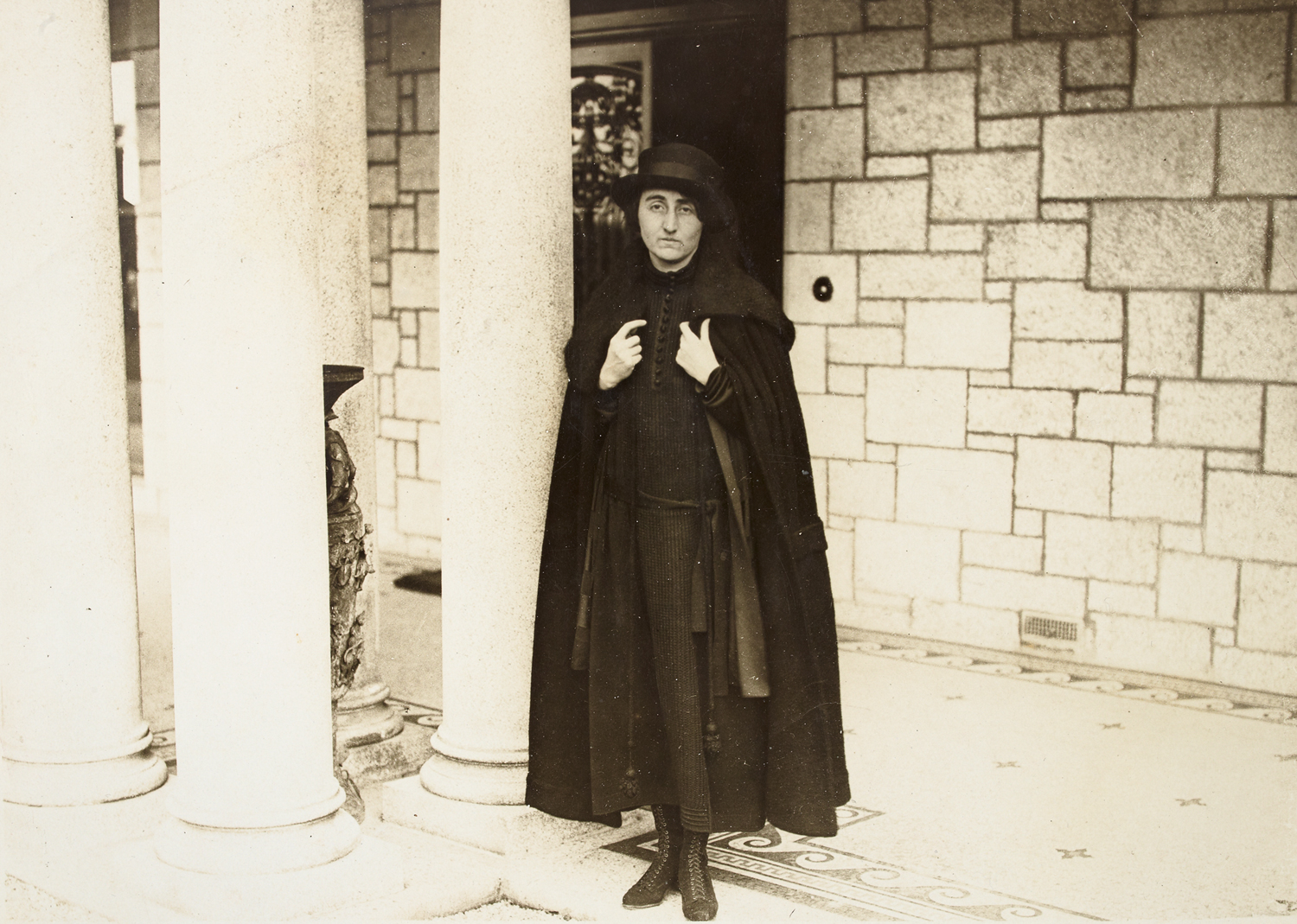
Croker by William David Hogan, c. 1921

The children's next suit against Croker focused on whether their father had established his homestead in Ireland or Palm Beach. The children petitioned in 1925, for a series of contracts between Richard and Croker to sell some of their property to John B. McDonald and the Palm Beach Estates and other property to be sold to an entity called Eccleston should be declared null and void. They argued that under Florida law, a married man could not sell his primary home to a corporation to directly or indirectly avoid the inheritance rights of the heirs and dower rights of the widow. Initially the children won their suit in the US federal district court and the conveyances were voided, vesting title to the properties in the heirs and widow. Croker appealed, arguing that her and Richard's primary domicile was in Ireland because they spent the last years of his life there, built his crypt there, and saw him buried there. The court agreed, and denied the children any share in property willed to the wife. The children appealed to the Eleventh Circuit Court of Appeals, which ruled in favor of Croker in 1926, denying the children any rights to her property. Croker continued to live in Ireland and winter in Florida until 1930, when she returned full-time to Palm Beach.

== Socialite and entertainer (1930–1945) ==
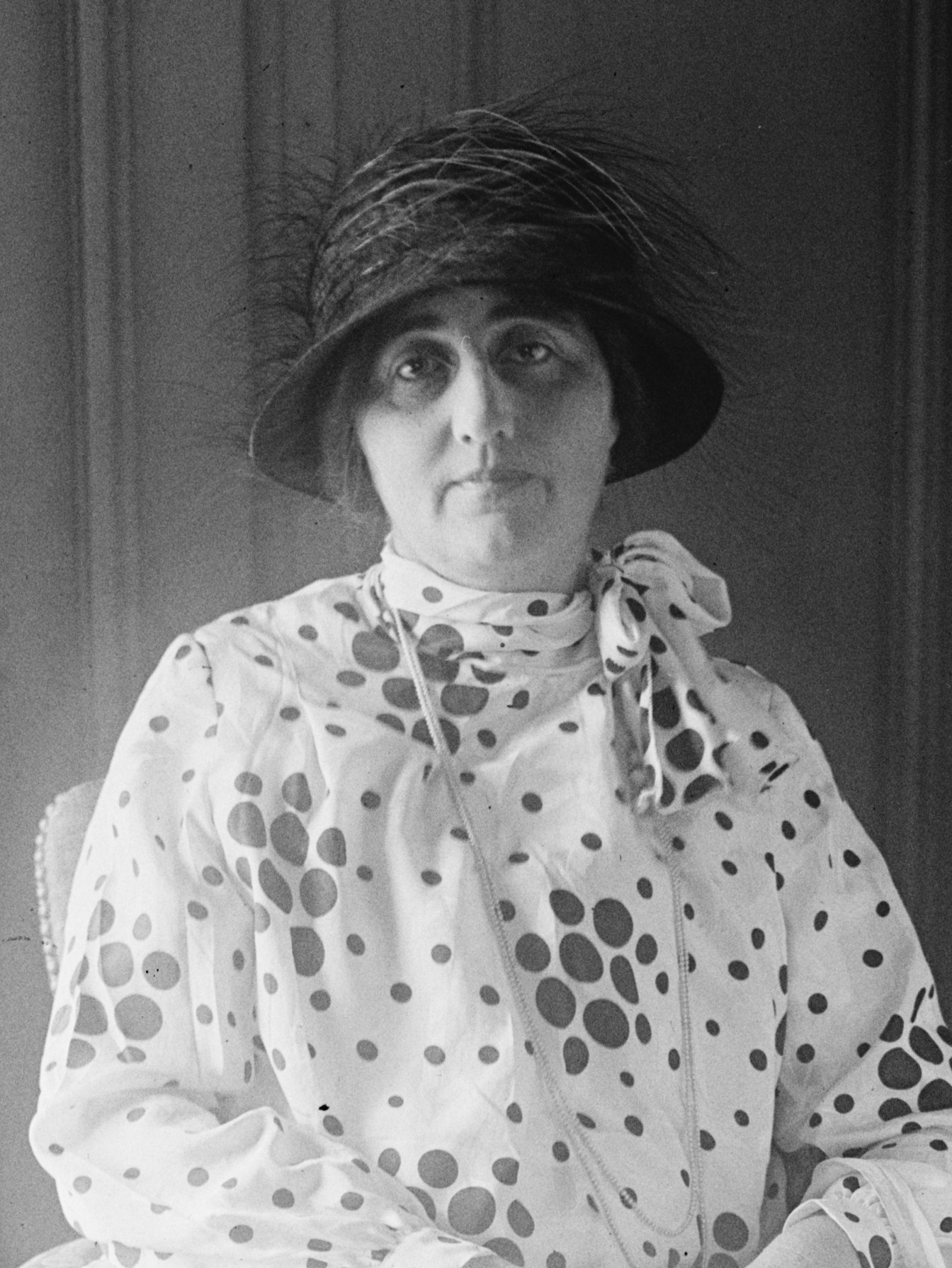
Croker, during her run for Congress in 1934

Croker's sister Gonia joined the rest of the Edmondson family at the Wigwam after her husband George Tinnen's death in 1929. Her mother lived with them, but their father had died in 1927. Croker was interested in liberal politics and became a supporter of Franklin Roosevelt in the early 1930s. She was said to be the first Palm Beach resident to allow Black beach-goers to use her beach. She gave numerous programs focused on her Native heritage to raise funds for the Red Cross and other charities, and often lent her home as a venue for charitable causes. In 1933, Croker was appointed as staff by Governor David Sholtz. As one of the first women in Florida to serve as staff to a governor, she was named chair of the Reconstruction Finance Corporation's local affiliate the Palm Beach County Emergency Relief and Civil Works Council. When she tried to fire a worker sent by the Civil Works Administration of the state, the entire council was dismissed. The following year she attempted to run as a representative for Florida to the United States House, but was defeated by J. Mark Wilcox.

To pay the enormous legal bills associated with the years of litigation, Croker decided to subdivide her Florida property and sell lots, but the Great Depression had impacted the value of the properties. She took out mortgages to pay her creditors and avoid having to take losses on the properties, but eventually she had to try to sell them to avoid foreclosures on the mortgage debts. Ultimately, in 1937, Croker filed for bankruptcy, but was able to retain the Wigwam for several years. The bankruptcy was fully discharged in 1943, and Croker lost both the Wigwam and Glencairn Castle. She went to Stillwater, Oklahoma where her sister Cherrie Garrett and her family were living to retrieve some of her husband's effects that they had taken from Glencairn. The Garretts had Croker arrested for attempted burglary claiming she had attempted to force her way into their home. At the hearing, Robert Garrett said he was awarded the personal belongings because he had paid $6,000 of his own money to the Irish Tax Commission. Croker countered that the items were worth $60,000, were willed to her, and asked the court for damages. The burglary charges were dismissed when the Garretts acknowledged that Croker was not trying to burglarize their home. They came to a settlement to return some of her property and Croker returned to Florida, where she lived in a modest apartment located at 520 Flamingo Drive, in West Palm Beach.

== Treasure hunter (1948–1957) ==
Croker took out a treasure hunting license for Florida in 1945, which allowed her to search in Bay, Escambia, Okaloosa, Santa Rosa and Walton Counties. In 1948, Croker announced that she had secured treasure maps in 1936 which showed two hoards of pirate loot worth $76,000,000 off the Florida coast near Pensacola and was looking for a reputable partner to help her retrieve it. Her plan was to locate the smaller cache of $4,000,000 and use those funds to finance excavation of the larger treasure. She made around a dozen attempts to retrieve the treasure, before entering a partnership with Hugh Ridenour in 1952. They began their operations in May, but failed to find anything. Croker continued to renew her treasure license through 1955. Near the end of her life, Croker was diagnosed with cancer and cared for by her sister Gonia.

== Death and legacy ==
Croker died on March 16, 1957, at her home in West Palm Beach. She was buried after a private ceremony on March 17, at Woodlawn Cemetery. Throughout her life, Croker was known widely and appeared internationally in news stories. Her fame brought with it numerous stories about her life, making it difficult to separate what was truthful from what was mythical.
