= Ellen Whitmore =

American teacher & missionary (1828-1861)

Ellen Rebecca Whitmore (also Goodale; March 2, 1828 – February 23, 1861) was the first principal teacher at the Cherokee Female Seminary in modern-day Oklahoma and later served as a missionary in Hawaii.

== Biography ==
Ellen Rebecca Whitmore graduated from Mount Holyoke College in 1850. Cherokee leader David Vann and William Potter Ross hired her and Sarah Worcester to teach at the newly built Cherokee Female Seminary, in Indian Territory (in modern-day Oklahoma). Her journey from Massachusetts started on October 5, 1850, and ended on November 13 of the same year when she, along with Sarah Worcester and David Vann, arrived in Park Hill, Oklahoma. Worcester's father and stepmother, who were missionaries at Park Hill, met them there. Upon their arrival to the location of the new school, Whitmore wrote in her journal:

"The little room where I am writing, and which they call mine, is unfinished,—has neither paint nor plaster,—but it has a nice comfortable bed, a nice rocking chair and a bright blazing fire in the corner, and its occupant is very cheerful and happy. Three thousand miles! . . . I can see the building from the piazza of this house with my eyeglass. It is a beautiful brick building with pillars on three sides of it and presents a fine appearance from here. I shall go as soon as I can to see it, and I look at it with a good deal of interest. The future is hidden from me—whether happiness or sorrow is in store for me in that school I cannot tell. If I can only see plainly that I am in the path of duty it is all that I could ask."

In May 1851 the Cherokee Female Seminary opened for classes and welcomed its first class or students, which consisted of twenty-five students. Due to the "hot and unhealthy months" the seminary concluded its first term early with only thirteen weeks out of twenty weeks of teaching completed.

While at the seminary Whitmore had to deal with a lack of funding, and a dwindling amount of student enrollment. After several months, Ellen Whitmore wrote to Cherokee Chief John Ross in March 1852, to announce that she planned to resign from her position of principal teacher at the Cherokee Female Seminary. She wished for help in finding someone to replace her. Whitmore added that she intended to marry a man from her hometown in New England.

In June 1852, Ellen Whitmore and Warren Goodale were married at the home of John Ross. After their marriage, the couple traveled to Hawaii where they worked as missionaries and worked with the Polynesian people of Hawaii. Goodale and her husband had five children. Ellen Whitmore Goodale died in Hawaii in 1861.

Whitmore and her fellow educators at the Cherokee Female Seminary later won recognition when her students were given exams on subjects they learned at the seminary. William S. Robertson was one of the people assessing the students, and after all of the exams were completed he stated that "They [the students] were a credit to their teachers & their Nation may well be proud of them."

== See also ==
- Mary Lyon
- Trail of Tears

== Sources ==
- Bowers, Lola, et al. The Journal of Ellen Whitmore. 1953.
- Agnew, Brad. “Retaining Good Faculty Tough for Seminaries.” Tahlequah Daily Press, 2 July 2016
- “Ellen Whitmore Goodale.” Mount Holyoke College, 8 June 2012, Accessed 4 Nov. 2020.
- Laubach, Maria; Smith, Joan K (2011). "Educating with Heart, Head, and Hands: Pestalozzianism, Women Seminaries, and the Spread of Progressive Ideas in Indian Territory". American Educational History Journal. 38 (1–2): 341–357. Archived from the original on 2013-01-31 – via HighBeam Research.
- Mihesuah, Devon A. Cultivating the Rosebuds : The Education of Women at the Cherokee Female Seminary, 1851-1909. Urbana, University of Illinois Press, 1998; ISBN 9780252066771
