= Rachel Caroline Eaton =

- Born: Rachel Caroline Eaton; July 7, 1869; Flint Creek, Cherokee Nation
- Died: September 20, 1938 (aged 69); Claremore, Oklahoma, U.S.
- Education: The University of Chicago
- Occupation: Teacher

Rachel Caroline Eaton (born July 7, 1869, near Flint Creek, Cherokee Nation) was believed to be the first Native American woman from Oklahoma to be awarded a Ph.D.

== Background ==
Rachel's father, George Washington Eaton, and her mother, Nancy Elizabeth Wared Williams, were married May 17, 1868. George was a Civil War Veteran, born in the Republic of Texas. Nancy was part Cherokee, and Nancy's mother walked on the Trail of Tears. Rachel had three siblings: James Calvin, Martha Pauline, and John Merrit Eaton. James Calvin was a farmer near Oolagah, Oklahoma. Martha Pauline married James Morning York, who was elected Assessor of Rogers County in 1918.

== Education ==
Rachel Eaton attended tribal schools and Cherokee Female Seminary in Tahlequah, Oklahoma. She graduated Seminary in 1887, but during her senior year the building burned down. For college, Rachel attended Drury College in Springfield, Missouri, then went on to the University of Chicago, where she got her Ph.D. Her dissertation, John Ross and The Cherokee Indians, was published in 1921, as a Cherokee history book.

== Career ==
Rachel taught in public schools of Cherokee nation, Cherokee Female Seminary (the new building built after the fire), Lake Erie College in Painsville, Ohio, and the Industrial Institute and College of Columbus, Mississippi. She also was the Dean of Women at Trinity University in Waxahachie, Texas. In 1920, Rachel was elected Superintendent of Public Instruction of Rogers County, Oklahoma, for 2 consecutive years. In 1936, she was inducted into the Oklahoma Hall of Fame as one of Oklahoma's outstanding women. Rachel died September 20, 1938, in Claremore, Oklahoma, after a long battle with breast cancer.
