= Lulu M. Hefner =

Cherokee businessperson (1874–1954)

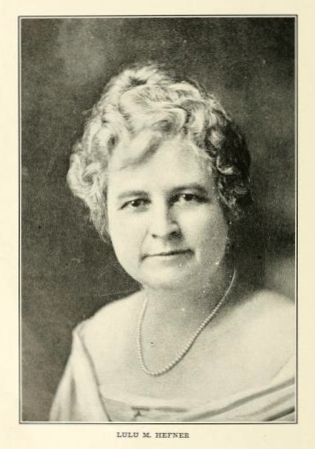
- Born: August 9, 1874
- Died: July 19, 1954 (aged 79)
- Education: Cherokee Female Seminary
- Occupation: Cherokee businessperson
- Known for: First female oil operator in Oklahoma
- Spouse: John Emory Hefner
- Children: 4

Lulu M. Hefner (August 9, 1874 – July 19, 1954) was a Cherokee businessperson from Nowata, Oklahoma who became successful in the oil industry. She was notable for being the first women to drill for oil on her own property and the first female oil operator in Oklahoma.

== Career ==
Lulu M. Hefner (sometimes spelled Heffner) was a Cherokee businesswoman from Nowata, Oklahoma who opened the first millinery store in that city. However, after learning about the excitement of oil drilling in her native state, she sold the shop and used her own funds to begin drilling on her own property, struck oil, and earned the title of "the first female oil operator in Oklahoma."

In a 1921 article about her accomplishments, Hefner called the state of Oklahoma "A Happy Hunting Ground" because of its oil reserves and as a nod to her Native American ancestry. By that year, Hefner had already drilled 28 oil wells, of which all produced oil, and none were dry wells, called "dusters." She was asked about her consistent luck in finding oil.

'I do not depend on luck,' responded Mrs. Heffner, instantly, 'I back geological science with my own judgement and intuition. I always operate on my own money and so I cannot afford to waste time on 'dusters' — I must get producers.'

After finding success in Oklahoma's oil industry, Hefner moved to Texas in search for more oil.

Although Hefner believed that "a woman's judgement beats a man's every time when applied to business," she said she had a collaborative relationship with the oil fraternity and was "always willing to listen to good counsel and advice from the older heads in the oil fields; but depends upon her own business judgment in the last analysis."

Hefner also managed several side businesses, including a successful motion picture theater and became the owner of the largest garage in Oklahoma. She enjoyed a considerable income from all of those ventures, and became known as "largest lady property owner" in Nowata.

== Family life ==
Lulu May Tittle was born to James Marion and Annie Henrietta Tittle. She was raised in Oklahoma and attended the Cherokee Female Seminary for her education. She married John Emory Hefner on December 29, 1892, at Lenapah, Oklahoma. Together they had four children: Roy Emory, born on March 13, 1903, Edith Lena, born on December 18, 1905, Helen K., born on October 2, 1905, and Ruby L., born on January 20, 1907.

== External sources ==
- Starr, E (2018). History of the Cherokee Indians and their legends and folk lore. Baltimore, MD: Genealogical Pub. Co.
- National Federation of Business and Professional Women's Clubs. (1920). Independent Woman.
