= Isabel Cobb =

First woman physician in Indian Territory (1858–1947)

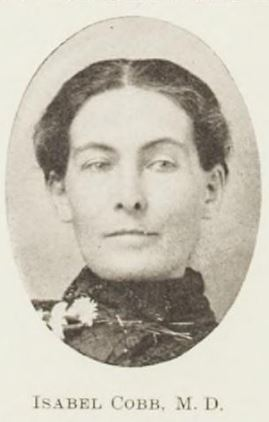
- Isabel Cobb, M.D.
- Born: Isabel Cobb; October 25, 1858; Morgantown, Tennessee
- Died: August 11, 1947 (aged 88); Wagoner, Oklahoma
- Other name: Belle
- Citizenship: Cherokee, American
- Occupations: Physician (M.D.), Educator
- Known for: First female physician in Indian Territory

Isabel "Belle" Cobb (October 25, 1858 – August 11, 1947) was a Cherokee physician and educator best known for being the first woman physician in Indian Territory.

== Early life and education ==
Cobb was born near Morgantown, Tennessee, the oldest of seven children of Joseph Benson and Evaline Clingan Cobb. She attended school in Cleveland, Tennessee until 1870, when at the age of 12, her family moved to Cooweescoowee District of the Cherokee Nation (near modern-day Wagoner, Oklahoma). Cobb was a good student, winning awards while attending school in Tennessee.

Shortly after arriving in the Cherokee Nation, Cobb's mother gave birth to her youngest sister. It was a very difficult delivery, and the family had to call for a midwife because there were no doctors in the area at the time. Although her mother survived the delivery, it left a lasting impression on Cobb and motivated her to pursue a career in medicine.

Cobb enrolled in the Cherokee Female Seminary in Tahlequah, Oklahoma and graduated in 1879. She continued her education at Glendale Female College in Glendale, Ohio where she graduated in 1881. At this point in her life, Cobb had received more education than most women of her day.

Cobb returned to Indian Territory to teach at the Cherokee Female Seminary from 1882 until it was destroyed by fire in 1887. She enrolled in the Woman's Medical College of Pennsylvania in 1888. It was only the second institution in the world, at that time, to offer women the opportunity to earn a Doctor of Medicine degree. Cobb earned her M.D. degree in 1892.

== Career ==
Cobb spent six months in an internship in New York at Staten Island Nursery and Child's hospital before returning home in 1893 to open a medical practice in the rural areas of Wagoner County. She worked out of a farmhouse on her family's homestead, where she treated approximately two hundred patients per year. She focused primarily on women and children. "Dr. Belle" as she was known, performed many surgeries inside the patient's home, traveling many miles in her horse-drawn carriage, and often refused to charge anything for her services.

== Retirement, personal life and death ==
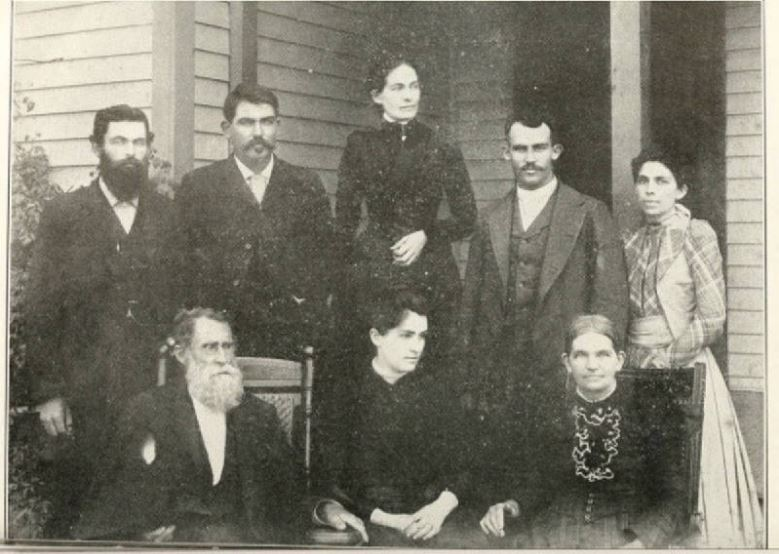
Isabel "Belle" Cobb, standing in the middle of the back row, became the first female doctor in Indian Territory, Oklahoma

Cobb continued her practice until she fell and broke her hip in 1930. She retired soon after as her health deteriorated. Cobb never married, but she did adopt a six-year-old Italian orphan in 1895. She was a member of the Cumberland Presbyterian church, as well as many literary societies in Wagoner County. Cobb died from natural causes on August 11, 1947, in Wagoner and was laid to rest at Pioneer Memorial Cemetery.

== Posthumous recognition ==
In 2015, students at Northeastern State University, which now sits on the land once occupied by the female and male Cherokee seminaries, voted to name the new student housing after Cobb. She received 43% of the 266 total votes cast. There is only one other building on campus named after a woman. Isabel Cobb Hall was dedicated in a ribbon cutting ceremony held September 19, 2016.

On March 26, 2016, Mayor Albert Jones of Wagoner declared the day "Dr. Belle Cobb Day." There was an event at the Wagoner Historical Museum attended by many of Cobb's relatives. The declaration from the mayor read in part, "Today, we celebrate Dr. Belle Cobb and pay tribute to her outstanding leadership, perseverance and giving heart...the city of Wagoner honors and commemorates Dr. Cobb for making a definitive mark on history."
