= Cherokee Female Seminary =

- U.S. National Register of Historic Places
- Location within Oklahoma Location within the United States
- Location: Northeastern State University campus, Tahlequah, Oklahoma, United States
- Coordinates: 35°55′13″N 94°58′12″W
- Built: 1889
- Architect: Charles E. Illsley
- NRHP reference No.: 73001558
- Added to NRHP: April 5, 1973

The Cherokee Female Seminary was built by the Cherokee Nation in 1889 near Tahlequah, Indian Territory. It replaced their original girls' seminary, the first Cherokee Female Seminary, that had burned down on Easter Sunday two years before. The Seminary was listed on the National Register of Historic Places in 1973.

The Cherokee Council chose to rebuild the school on a 40-acre (160,000 m^{2}) site north of Tahlequah, Oklahoma near Hendricks Spring. Two years later, on May 7, 1889, the dedication ceremonies were held in honor of the new building. The school was modeled after other female seminaries of the time.The Female Seminary was owned and operated by the Cherokee Nation until March 6, 1909, after Oklahoma had been admitted as a state as in 1907, and tribal land claims were extinguished. At this point, the state converted the seminary into a normal school.

The Cherokee Nation ran both a male and female seminary in this territory, showing the importance placed on education within the Nation. Female seminaries were a larger cultural movement across the United States in the mid-nineteenth century, by which time they had taken over the role played traditionally by the boarding school, which had offered a more family-like atmosphere.

== Location and property ==
The Cherokee Female Seminary was located in Tahlequah, Oklahoma, a small city near the Ozark Mountains. Tahlequah was also home to the Cherokee Male Seminary and public schools and was the capital of the Cherokee Nation.

The Seminary consisted of a large building on a hill that housed up to 175 students plus staff and stewards. At the new site's creation in 1889, the building had electric lights, steam-powered heating, and water supplied from a local spring. It housed a parlor, a library, a kitchen, a chapel, and bedrooms. The staff included teachers and a medical superintendent as Cherokee social progress placed an increasing emphasis on providing quality healthcare alongside education.

== Student life and curriculum ==
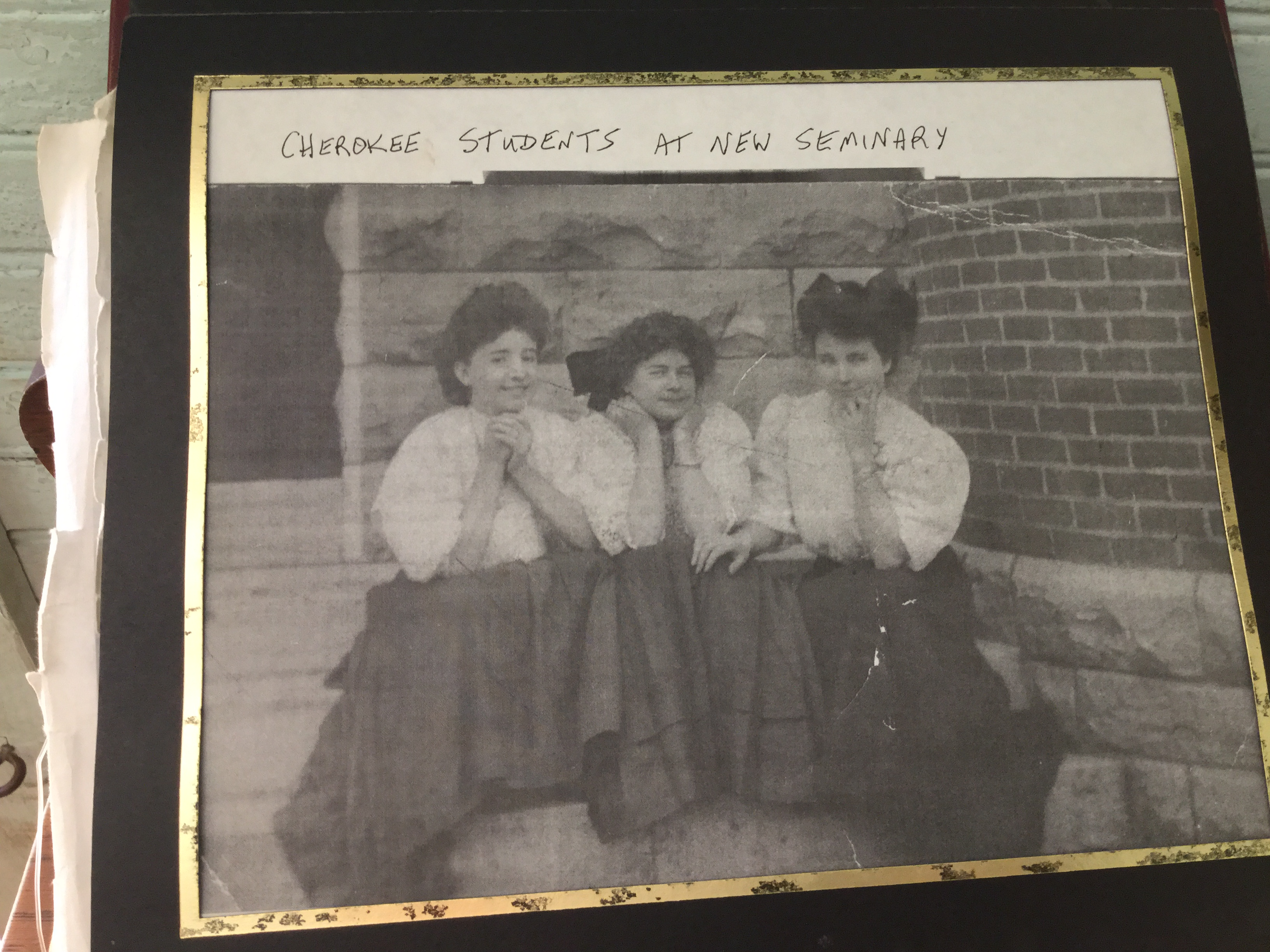
Students at the New Cherokee Female Seminary from the Cherokee Heritage Center

The Cherokee Female Seminary in Tahlequah was designed after Mount Holyoke in Massachusetts and its first two teachers were alumni of the school, Ellen Whitmore and Sarah Worcester. Miss Florence Wilson served as the principal of the Cherokee Female Seminary at both its original and rebuilt site from 1875 to 1901. She is regarded by many of the teachers and alumni as the most influential figure in the school's history.

The seminary began by offering the four high school years and eventually expanded to grades 1-12, with grades 1-5 becoming the "primary department" and 6-8 the "preparatory department".

=== High School ===
High School students took the following courses over four years: English, US History, Physiology, Arithmetic, Latin, Botany, Algebra, General History, Geometry, Physics, Civics, and Chemistry. Instrumental and vocal music were offered for an additional charge.

The seminary also had a large focus on Christianity and its principles were widespread in the curriculum. Church attendance was mandatory for students. Students were also taught domestic skills, like sewing, as endorsed by the US federal government.

== Institutional history ==
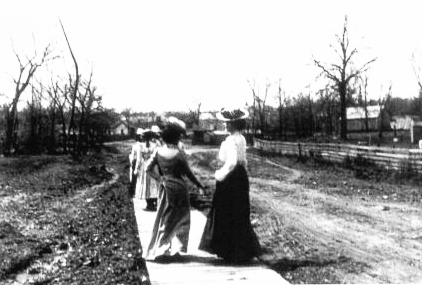
Cherokee Female Seminary graduating class of 1902, photographed by Jennie Ross Cobb (Cherokee)

The Cherokee Nation increasingly valued education throughout the 17th century and set aside proceeds from land cessions to the United States in 1819 to be invested in education for their children. The Cherokee Female Seminary was established alongside the Cherokee Male Seminary during the annual session of the Cherokee Nation's National Council in November 1846. The Female Seminary opened to students in 1850, one year before the Male Seminary.

After a fire burned down the original site, a new building opened in 1889. According to the Cherokee Advocate newspaper, up to three thousand people attended the reopening celebrations in a precession that totaled a mile long.

When the state converted the seminary into a normal school, the new State Legislature of Oklahoma passed an act providing for the creation of Northeastern State Normal School at Tahlequah, Oklahoma. The act also authorized the purchase of the building, land, and equipment of the Cherokee Female Seminary from the Cherokee Tribal Government. At the start of the next academic year, on September 14, the state held its first classes at the newly founded Northeastern State Normal School, primarily intended to train teachers of elementary grades. The institution has been developed over the decades and is now Northeastern State University, offering a range of curriculum and graduate programs.

== Present day and legacy ==
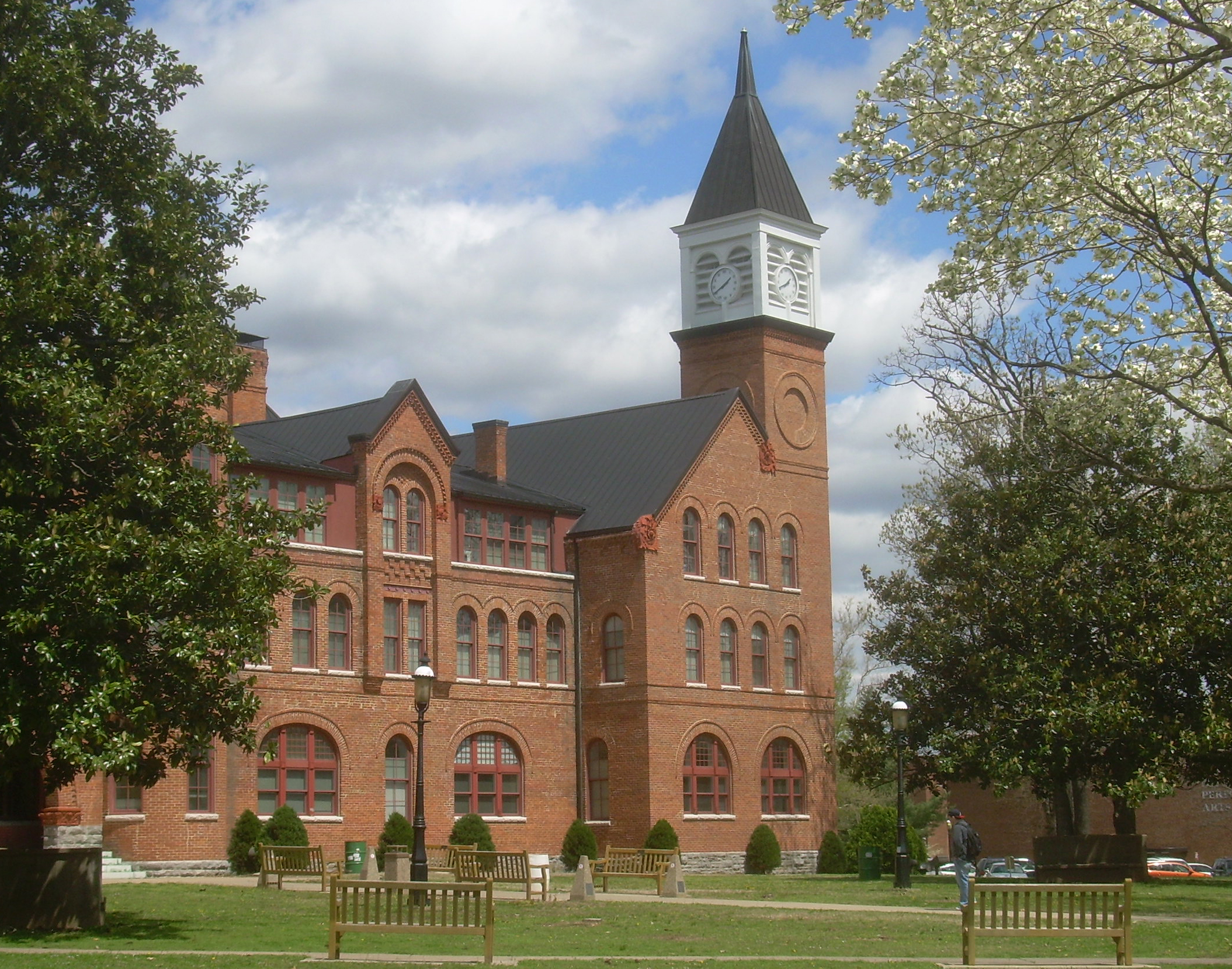
Seminary Hall at Northeastern State University in Tahlequah

What is now called Seminary Hall, in honor of the Cherokee Seminary, is the oldest building on NSU's campus. It was built in 1889 by St. Louis architect Charles E. Illsley, who designed it in the Romanesque Revival style, complete with fortress-like turrets flanking the main entrance and a clock tower that resembles a church steeple and rises two stories above the rest of the building. In 1994, the building was completely restored.

The building was renovated and upgraded in 2020, with the work aided by a $4 million grant from the Cherokee Nation. That work included using salvaged wood and brick from the 1800s to match the original building materials where needed, and replacing aluminum window frames from a prior renovation with custom wood frames typical of the period. In addition, half-octagon-shaped roof dormers were added, as they were drawn in the original architect's plans.

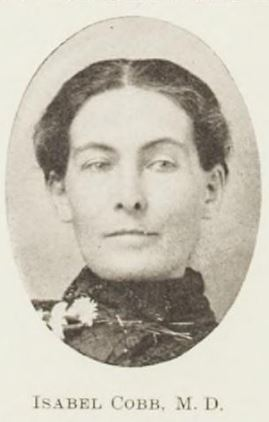
Isabel Cobb

The building now houses classrooms along with academic and faculty offices. It was the first campus classroom building wired for multimedia instruction. At the main entrance of the building are three murals painted in the 1930s as a WPA project by Stephen Mopope, Jack Hokeah (both Kiowa), and Albin Jake (Pawnee).

=== Notable alumni ===
Prior to her further education, Rachel Caroline Eaton attended the first inception of the Seminary, before it burned down. She is believed to be the first indigenous Oklahoman woman to earn a Ph.D. She later returned to teach at the new Cherokee Female Seminary. Carrie Bushyhead Quarles was the valedictorian of the class of 1855 and taught in the Cherokee School system for almost forty years. Another graduate from the first school was Carlotta Archer. She graduated in 1883, then taught music at the new seminary after the fire from 1894 to 1902.

The first class to graduate from the Cherokee Female Seminary had two students, Tennie Steele Fuller and Belle Cobb. Belle returned back to the Seminary to teach before studying medicine. Lulu Hefner was an Oklahoman businesswoman who attended the Seminary. She is remembered as the first female oil operator in Oklahoman history. Bula Benson Edmondson graduated in 1902, taught for several years, and participated in suffrage parades.

== See also ==
- Isabel Cobb
- Lulu M. Hefner
- Rachel Caroline Eaton
- Mabel Washbourne Anderson
- Cherokee Male Seminary
- Female seminaries
- Women in education in the United States
