= Jesse Bushyhead =

Cherokee religious and political leader

Jesse Bushyhead (Cherokee ᎤᎾᏚᏘ, romanized Unaduti; 1804–1844) was a Cherokee religious and political leader, and a Baptist minister. He was born near the present-day town of Cleveland, Tennessee. As a young man, he was ordained a Baptist minister.

A member of the John Ross faction of the Cherokee, he was dispatched by Ross in 1837 on a mission to the Seminole. Although Bushyhead opposed the federal policy forcing Indian Removal to west of the Mississippi River, he led a party of about 1,000 people on what is known as the Trail of Tears. On his arrival in 1839 near present-day Westville, Oklahoma, he established the Baptist Mission. He became chief justice of the Cherokee nation in 1840 and remained in that office until his death. His eldest son, Dennis Bushyhead, held several offices in the Cherokee Nation, including as Principal Chief. He served from 1879 to 1887.

== Early life ==
Jesse Bushyhead was born in September 1804 to a half-blood Cherokee woman named Nancy Foreman in a Cherokee settlement near the present city of Cleveland, Tennessee. His father was also of mixed-race Cherokee ancestry, John Bushyhead Stuart. He was educated at Candy's Creek Mission, and taught at several schools for boys in the Candy's Creek area.

== Career as a missionary ==
Bushyhead was baptized as a Christian and became an avid member of the Baptist church in 1830. He began converting other Cherokee to Christianity, established a church at Amohee in Tennessee (then his home town), and became a close associate of noted Baptist missionary, Reverend Evan Jones. Jones preached in English, while Bushyhead translated the sermon into Cherokee. One writer claimed that Bushyhead was, "... the best interpreter in the nation."

In 1832, Reverend Jones recommended to the Baptist Board of Foreign Missions that Bushyhead be appointed as an assistant missionary. The appointment was made, and Bushyhead served in this role for the next eleven years. He is said to have been the first Cherokee to have been ordained as a Baptist minister. He continued to work closely with Jones, not only preaching to the Cherokees, but translating the Book of Genesis and other religious books into the Cherokee language, using the Cherokee Syllabary. He also served as pastor of the Amohee church.

== Family life ==
Jesse Bushyhead's home in Cleveland was on Mouse Creek near the present-day Cleveland High School. He married Eliza (née Wilkerson; transcribed as Wilkinson by some of her descendants), with whom he had nine children: Jane (m. Drew), Dennis, Daniel, Charlotte (m. Mayes), Edward "Ned", Caroline "Carrie", Eliza Missouri (m. Alberty), Jesse Jr., and Nancy Sarah (m. McNair).

Jane, his oldest daughter, married Richard Drew, who served in the Cherokee Senate from 1841 to 1843.

His oldest son, Dennis, was notable for serving as Principal Chief for two terms, from 1879 to 1887.

Ned was a newspaperman, miner, and lawman, who served as sheriff and police chief of San Diego, California, and was co-founder of the San Diego Union.

Carrie taught in the Cherokee school system for almost forty years, training numerous tribal leaders.

Eliza Missouri, who was born on the Trail of Tears to Indian Territory, married Bluford Alberty, with whom she ran a noted hotel in Talequah.

== Removal to Indian Territory ==
Jesse Bushyhead had opposed removal of the Cherokees from their homeland in the Southeast. As the deadline approached when General Winfield Scott and the U.S. Army would escort the people to a new homeland in the Indian Territory, Rev. Bushyhead volunteered to lead one of the groups of emigres. The group who followed him was from a part of the nation where there was no capable leader.

The group led by Bushyhead followed the same northern route taken by the group led by Evan Jones. The route led them north through Tennessee and Kentucky to an Ohio River crossing at Golconda, Illinois, then west to cross the Mississippi River near Cape Girardeau, Missouri. After that, they turned southwest to Indian Territory. At the start of the trek, the group numbered 950 people. During the journey, the group experienced 38 deaths and 6 births, including that of one of his daughters, Eliza Missouri Bushyhead, the rest arrived safely at their destination on February 23, 1839.

The trek terminated at a place Bushyhead called Pleasant Hill, about 4 miles (6.4 km) north of the present day town of Westville, Oklahoma, and about 70 miles (110 km) from Fort Smith, Arkansas. The Cherokees called the place "Breadtown" because food rations were distributed there. Later, they named the place "Baptist Mission."

== Death and burial ==
Rev. Jesse Bushyhead died on July 17, 1844, after a brief, but unspecified illness. He was buried at the old Baptist Mission cemetery near Westville.

- Bushyhead, Rev. Jesse, Grave
- U.S. National Register of Historic Places
- Location within Oklahoma Location within the United States
- Nearest city: Westville, Oklahoma
- Coordinates: 36°2′8″N 94°34′58″W
- Area: less than one acre
- Built: 1844
- MPS: Cherokee Trail of Tears MPS
- NRHP reference No.: 04001334
- Added to NRHP: December 06, 2004

His grave at the Baptist Mission Cemetery is marked by a 15-foot-tall (4.6 m) marble monument. His grave is the only surviving property associated with his life, and as such is listed on the National Register of Historic Places listings in Adair County, Oklahoma.

One side of the monument reads: "Sacred to the memory of Rev. Jesse Bushyhead, born in the old Cherokee Nation in East Tennessee, September, 1804; died in the present Cherokee Nation, July 17, 1844. 'Well done, thou good and faithful servant; thou hast been faithful over a few things, I will make thee ruler over many things. Enter thou into the joy of thy Lord.'" An inscription in Cherokee is at the bottom.

The other side of the monument bears the following inscription: "Rev. Jesse Bushyhead was a man noble in person and noble in heart. His choice was to be a true and faithful minister of his Lord and Master rather than any high and worldly position. He loved his country and people, serving them from time to time in many important offices and missions. He united with the Baptist Church in his early manhood and died as he had lived, a devoted Christian."

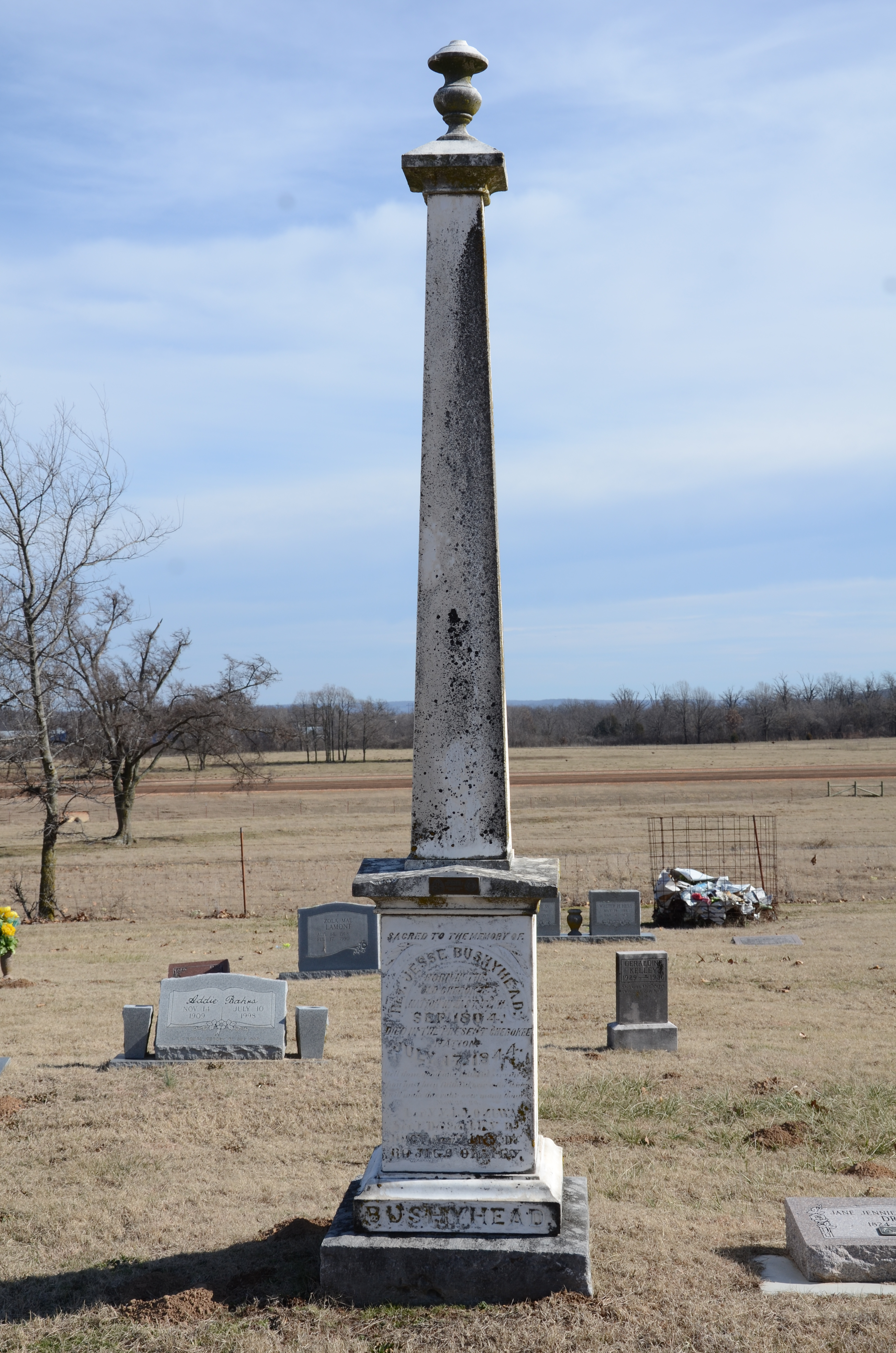

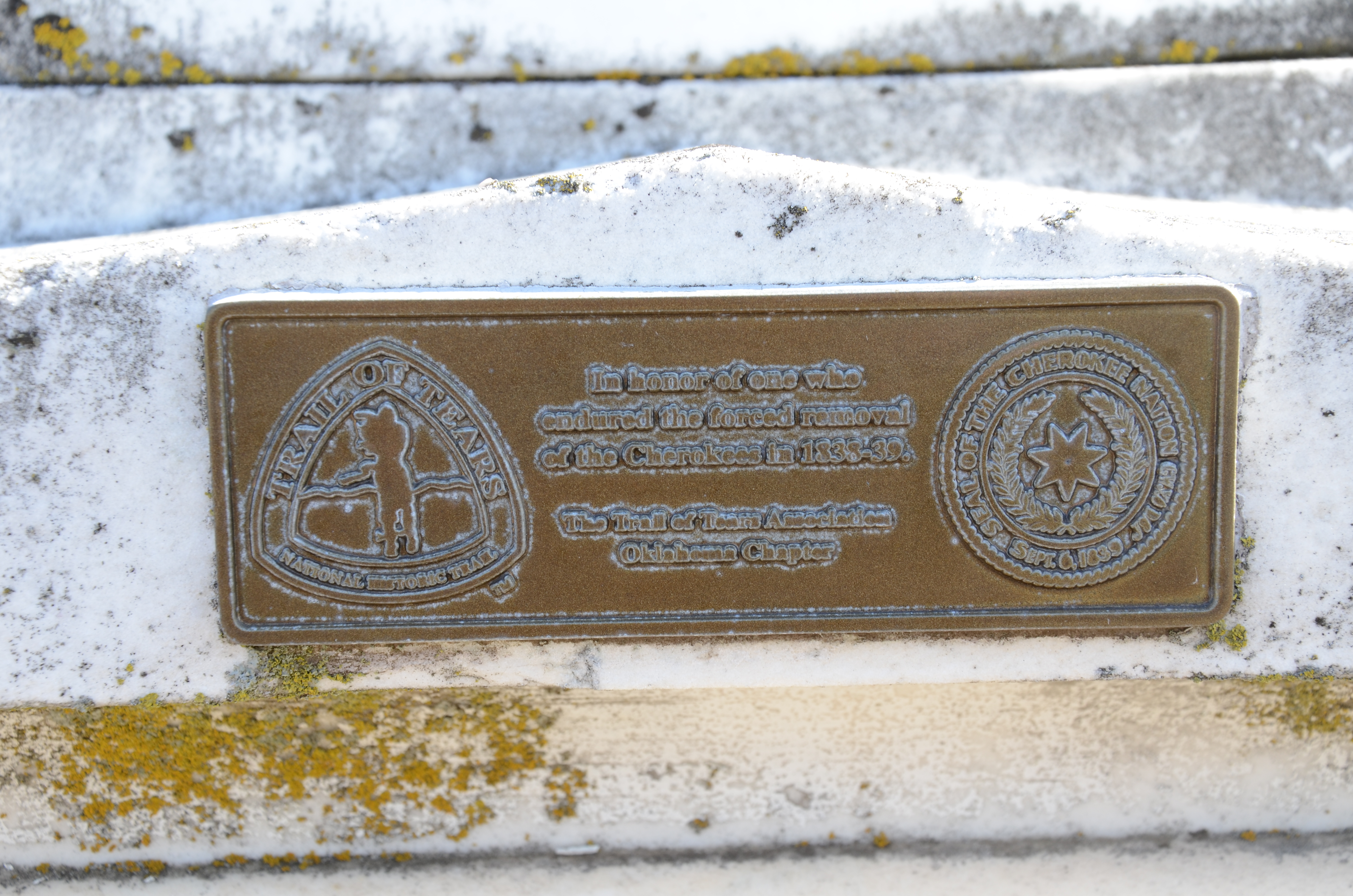

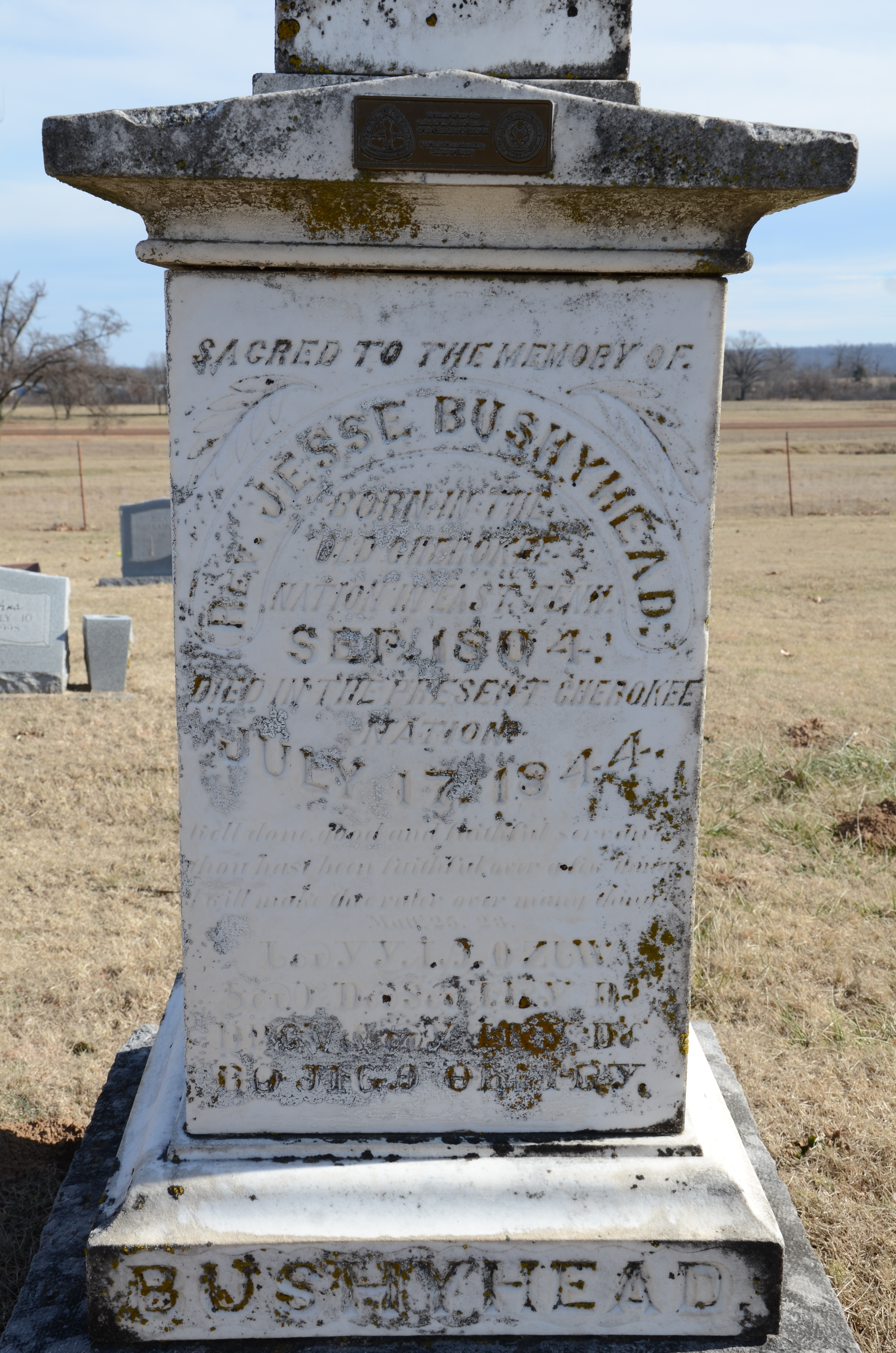

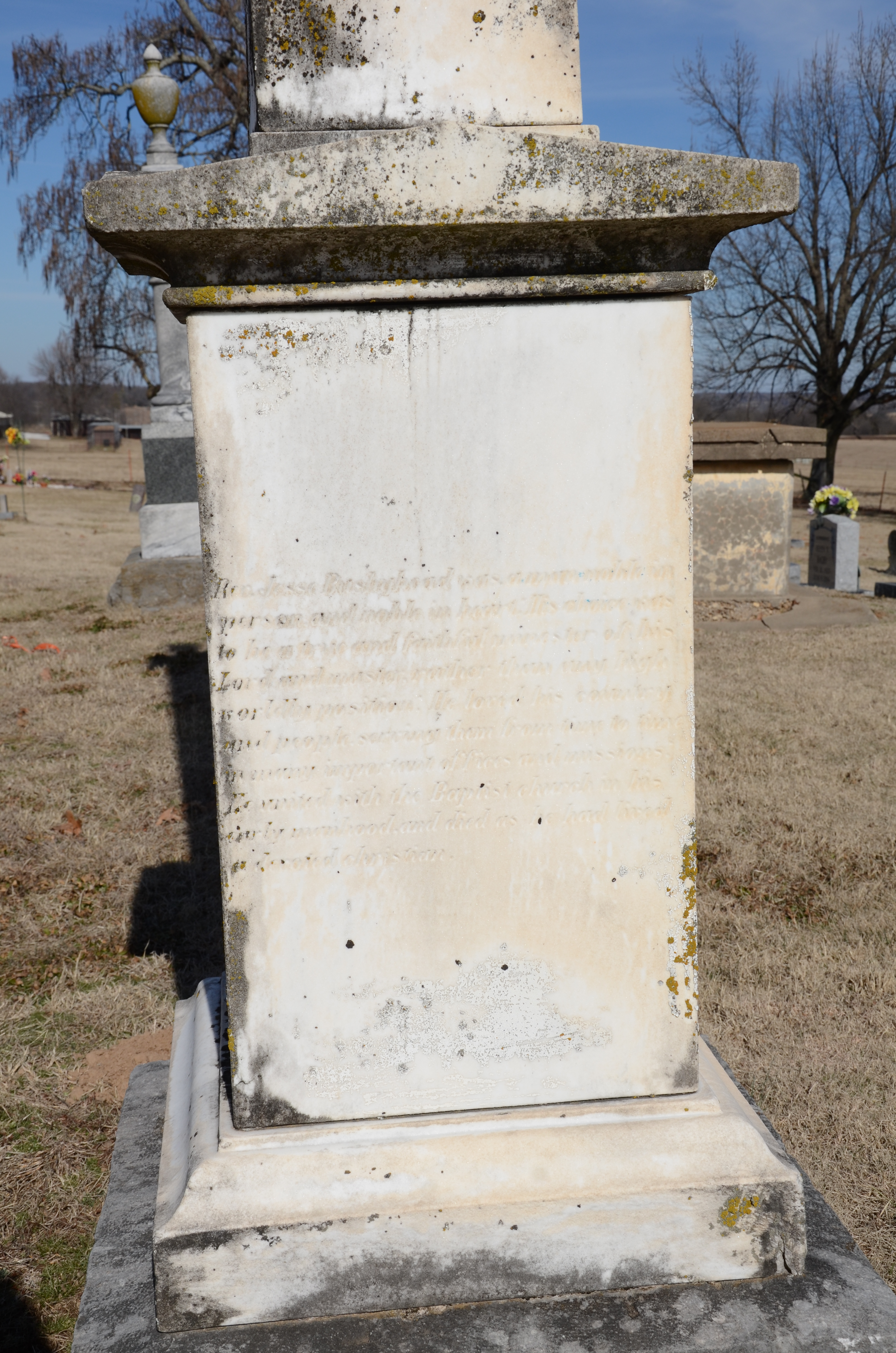

== Literature ==
- Chronicles of Oklahoma, volume 13, p. 351 note 3
- Oklahoma State Historical Preservation Office page on Jesse Bushyhead grave
- Murrow, J. S. "The Rev. Jesse Bushyhead: Cherokee Indian and Missionary" 2015, ISBN 978-1508595113.
- Wimberly, Dan B. 2017. Cherokee in Controversy: The Life of Jesse Bushyhead. Mercer University Press.
