= Buffington Hotel =

- U.S. National Register of Historic Places
- Location within Oklahoma Location within the United States
- Location: Westville, Oklahoma
- Coordinates: 35°59′36″N 94°34′5″W
- Built: 1912
- Architectural style: Early Commercial
- NRHP reference No.: 84002929
- Added to NRHP: February 23, 1984

The Buffington Hotel is a historic hotel in Westville, Oklahoma, United States. The brick building was built in 1912 and features an arcade of round-arch windows on the East and South facades. The hotel was the premiere hotel in Westville when the town was railway stop. It was added to the National Register of Historic Places in 1984. The hotel has been greatly altered from its original form, including; the southeast breezeway having been bricked off and a room created and the second story bay windows covered in aluminum siding. The owner as of 2014 is a Westville man named Bud Rose. The hotel had been used as multi-unit housing until 2004, when Mr. Rose converted the entire downstairs into a personal residence. The upstairs twenty-one rooms are now vacant.

Buffington Hotel was recently purchased and is now undergoing renovations. Renovation began in early 2020 and progress has been slowed due to the pandemic, but the hotel is looking better than it has in the past few years.

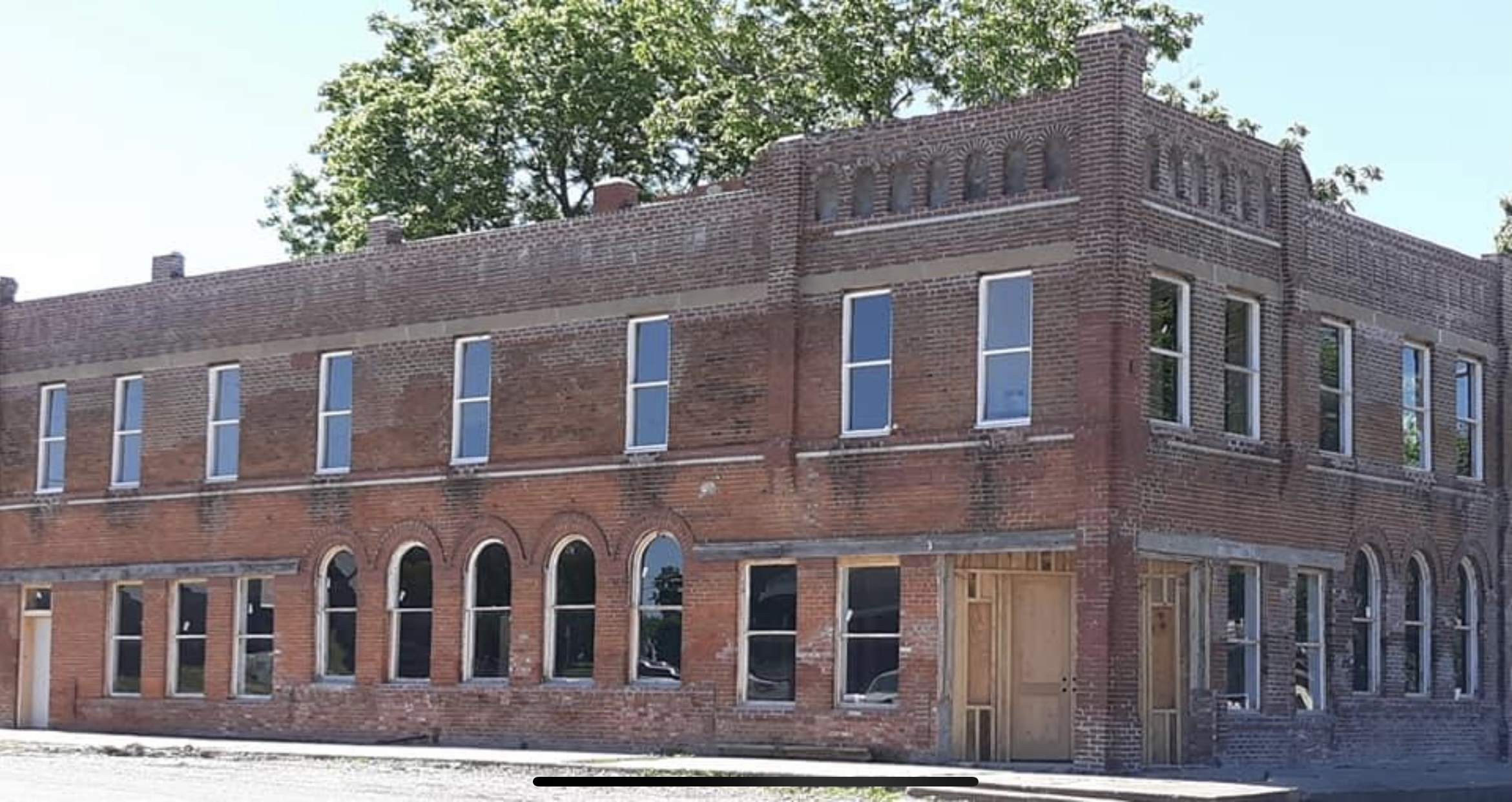
A view of the renovation from the southeast corner.
