= Opera Block =

- U.S. National Register of Historic Places
- Location within Oklahoma Location within the United States
- Location: Main St., Westville, Oklahoma
- Coordinates: 35°59′35″N 94°34′5″W
- Area: less than one acre
- Built: 1911
- Architectural style: Early Commercial, Plains Commercial
- NRHP reference No.: 84002934
- Added to NRHP: February 23, 1984

The Opera Block was a historic building in Westville, Oklahoma. The brick building was built in 1911–1912. It was used for multiple purposes throughout its existence, serving commercial, government and entertainment functions. For a time it served as the Westville City Hall. The second floor was configured as an opera house and auditorium. It was added to the National Register of Historic Places in 1984 and was demolished in 1998.
