= Eliza Bushyhead Alberty =

Cherokee educator and businesswoman

Eliza Alberty
- Born: Eliza Missouri Bushyhead; January 3, 1839; Cape Girardeau, Missouri
- Died: November 5, 1919 (aged 80); Claymore, Oklahoma (now Claremore, Oklahoma)
- Other names: Eliza Vann
- Citizenship: Cherokee, American
- Occupations: Businesswoman, school administrator, educator
- Known for: Lobbied state for Normal School that became NSU, Tahlequah, Oklahoma

Eliza Missouri Alberty (née Bushyhead; January 3, 1839 – November 6, 1919) was a Cherokee businesswoman, school administrator and educator.

== Early life and education ==
Eliza was one of nine children born to the Rev. Jesse Bushyhead (also called Unaduti), a Cherokee and Baptist minister, and Eliza (née Wilkinson; transcribed as Wilkerson by some of her descendants). She was born in 1839 in Cape Girardeau, Missouri, while her father led a group of Cherokee to Indian Territory during the Trail of Tears.

Upon arrival in the new territory, her father established a Baptist mission near what is now Westville, Arkansas. Alberty attended the mission until 1854, when she enrolled in the Cherokee Female Seminary at Park Hill, Cherokee Nation. She graduated in the second class from the Seminary in 1856.

== Career and personal life ==
Shortly after her graduation, Alberty took a position teaching at the Post Oak Grove and Vann's Valley schools, both Cherokee Nation public schools, until 1859. She had married David Rowe Vann, one year earlier in 1858. Three years after Vann's death in 1870, she married Bluford West Alberty, a lawyer and political figure.

The Albertys were appointed stewards of the Cherokee Insane Asylum, known colloquially as "Belleview". In 1885, the Albertys purchased a hotel in Tahlequah and named it "National Hotel". After her husband's death in 1889, Alberty managed the hotel and made it the most successful in Indian Territory. She was very active in the Baptist church and was commonly called "Aunt Eliza" in the community and by those attending the seminary because of their affection for her.

== Death ==
Alberty died at the age of 80 in Claymore, Oklahoma. Her remains were transported to Tahlequah for burial. Along the way her nephew, Owen McNair of Dallas, Texas, was presented with a boquet of Chrysanthemums grown from stems taken from the old Chief Bushyhead garden in Fort Gibson. She was laid to rest near her older brother, Dennis Wolf Bushyhead, Principal Chief of the Cherokee Nation from 1879–1888.

== Notable moments ==
Upon Oklahoma becoming a state in 1907, Alberty lobbied to have a state normal school established in Tahlequah. She was successful and to recognize her efforts, George Washington Steele, the first governor of Oklahoma, presented her with the pen he used to sign the legislation into law that created the Northeastern Normal School.
