= Dennis Bushyhead =

Cherokee leader (1826–1898)

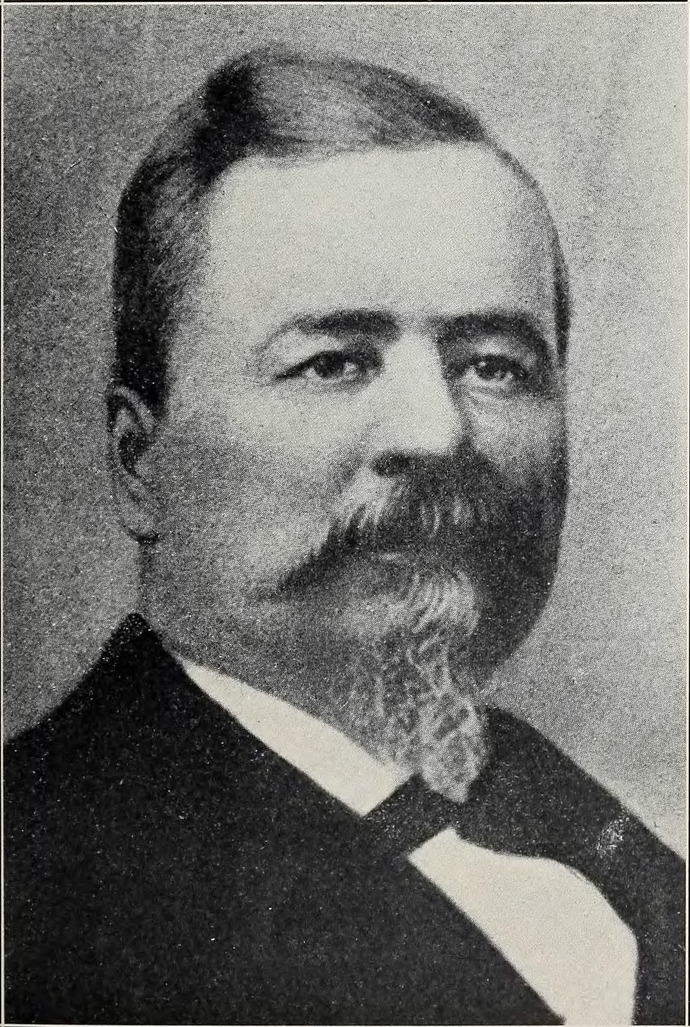
Chief Bushyhead in the late 1800s

Dennis Wolf Bushyhead (Cherokee: Unadena; March 18, 1826 – February 4, 1898) was a leader in the Cherokee Nation after they had removed to Indian Territory. Born into the Wolf Clan, he was elected as Principal Chief, serving two terms, from 1879 to 1887.

== Biography ==
Dennis Wolf Bushyhead was born on Mouse Creek near present-day Cleveland, Tennessee, in the eastern part of the state. He was the oldest son of Rev. Jesse Bushyhead, whose Cherokee name was Unaduti. His mother, Eliza (née Wilkinson; transcribed as Wilkerson by some of her descendants), of the Wolf Clan, was from Georgia. She was his father's second wife. Both parents were of mixed-race ancestry and identified as Cherokee. Dennis was one of nine children born to Jesse and Eliza Bushyhead. A younger sister was Eliza Bushyhead Alberty.

Also known as Unadena, meaning "woolly head" in Cherokee, the boy Jesse was reared in his parents' Cherokee culture. He started school in 1833 at Candy Creek Mission, Tennessee, under the charge of Rev. Holland. In 1835 he went to the Mission School at Valley River in North Carolina and remained there for one year, where he was taught by Evan Jones, a noted Baptist minister and close associate of his father. Bushyhead was a supporter of the Chief John Ross faction, when the tribe was divided by opinions about making a treaty to cede land and move west of the Mississippi River, as was being urged by the federal government.

In 1838, as part of Indian Removal, Rev. Jesse Bushyhead conducted a detachment of Cherokee, numbering nearly 1000 people from the old nation, to Beattie's Prairie in the Delaware District (Indian Territory) as part of Indian Removal from the Southeast. His son Dennis was among the party. In the following year, the boy attended Mission School at Park Hill, Cherokee Nation, overseen by Rev. Samuel A. Worcester. He studied there for one year. In 1841 his father sent Dennis to college (more similar to a seminary or prep school) at what is now known as the Lawrenceville School in Lawrenceville, New Jersey. In March 1841 Bushyead was invited to join Chief Ross' delegation to Washington, D.C. to attend the inauguration of General William Henry Harrison as President of The United States.

Bushyhead studied in New Jersey for three years, completing his education at Lawrenceville in July 1844. He was enrolled in the sophomore class at Princeton University when he learned that his father had died and he had to return to the Cherokee Nation.

In October 1844 Bushyhead started work as a clerk for Lewis Ross, brother of Chief John Ross, serving until the summer of 1847. He was elected as clerk for the Cherokee Senate in October 1847, serving for one year.

In November 1871, Bushyhead was elected as treasurer of the Cherokee nation and held the position for a full term of four years. He was reelected to the post in 1875. In 1879, Bushyhead was elected as the Principal Chief of the Cherokee Nation. He served from 1879 to 1887. During this period, in 1883 he vetoed a bill by the Cherokee Senate to exclude Cherokee Freedmen from sharing in the proceeds of additional compensation by the federal government for payment of the Cherokee Outlet. He reminded them of the terms of the 1866 treaty with the United States after the Civil War, by which Freedmen who remained in the Nation were to have full citizenship rights forever. The US authorized an additional $300,000 that year. The Cherokee National Council overrode Bushyhead's veto, setting up discrimination against the Freedmen that has haunted relations among tribal members into the 21st century. He also dealt with issues of railroad rights-of-way, land allotment under the Dawes Act, education, white intruders, tribal citizenship, and grazing rights. He was succeeded by Joel B. Mayes as Principal Chief in 1887.

== Family life ==
On September 6, 1869, Bushyhead married a widow, Elizabeth Alabama Adair (née Schrimsher), from Fort Gibson. They had four children together: Jesse Crary (1870–1942), Mary Elizabeth (1873–1930), Sarah Catherine (1876–1908), and Dennis Bushyhead, Jr. (1880–1961). Elizabeth Bushyhead died on October 30, 1882.

On October 31, 1883, Bushyhead married Eloise Perry Butler (1859–1940), a niece of a U.S. Senator. She helped raise the four young children from his first wife, and the couple had two children of their own: James Butler (1884–1965) and Frances Taylor Bushyhead (1887–1929).

== Death ==
Dennis Bushyhead died February 4, 1898, in Tahlequah, the capital of the Cherokee Nation, and was buried in the Tahlequah City Cemetery.

== Legacy and honors ==
- Bushyhead, Oklahoma, was named after the principal chief. It is a small rural community in Rogers County, Oklahoma.

== Sources ==
Preceded by Charles Thompson	Principal Chief of the Cherokee Nation; 1879–1887	Succeeded by Joel B. Mayes
