= John Richard Alden =

American historian (1908–1991)

- Born: January 23, 1908; Grand Rapids, Michigan, U.S.
- Died: August 14, 1991 (aged 83); Clearwater, Florida, U.S.
- Education: University of Michigan (AB, MA, PhD)
- Occupations: Historian; author
- Spouse(s): Pearl B. Wells (m. 1934; died 1979) Kathleen C. Smith (m. 1980; died 1990)
- Children: 1
- Writing career
- Notable awards: Beveridge Award (1945)

John Richard Alden (January 23, 1908, Grand Rapids, Michigan – August 14, 1991, Clearwater, Florida) was an American historian and author of a number of books on the era of the American Revolutionary War.

== Biography ==
Alden graduated from the University of Michigan with A.B. in 1929), M.A. in 1930, and Ph.D. in 1939. After teaching at Michigan State Normal College (now called Eastern Michigan University), and subsequently at Bowling Green State University in Ohio, he taught at the University of Nebraska from 1945 to 1955. He joined the faculty of Duke University in 1955, where he chaired the Department of History from 1957 to 1960, and in 1963 was appointed James B. Duke Professor of History. He retired from Duke University in 1976. He also taught at the University of Chicago and Columbia University. He was a reviewer for the New York Times Book Review.

In 1934, Alden married Pearl B. Wells (1906–1979). In 1980 he married Kathleen C. Smith, who died in 1990. Upon his death in 1991 he was survived by a daughter from his first marriage and by a granddaughter.

== Awards and honors ==
- 1945 — Albert J. Beveridge Award of the American Historical Association
- 1955 — Guggenheim Fellowship for the academic year 1955–1956
- 1960 — Commonwealth Fund Lecturer at University College, London
- 1960 — Donald Fleming Lecturer (23rd Series) at Louisiana State University
- 1979 — festschrift published as The Revolutionary War in the South—Power, Conflict, and Leadership: Essays in Honor of John Richard Alden

== Selected publications ==
- John Stuart and the Southern Colonial Frontier. Ann Arbor: University of Michigan Press. 1944.
- General Gage in America (Being Principally A History of His Role in the American Revolution). Baton Rouge: Louisiana State University Press. 1948.
- General Charles Lee: Traitor or Patriot?. Louisiana State University Press. 1951.
- The American Revolution, 1775–1783. New York: Harper & Bros. 1954.
- The South in the Revolution, 1763--1789. A History of the South. Vol. 3. Louisiana State University Press. 1985 [1st pub. 1957]. ISBN 9780807100035.
- Pioneer America. New York: Knopf. 1966.
- The First South. Louisiana State University Press. 1968.
- A History of the American Revolution. New York: Knopf. 1969.
  - Alden, John R. (2013-07-10). A History of the American Revolution. Knopf Doubleday Publishing. ISBN 9780307831385.
- Robert Dinwiddie: Servant of the Crown. Colonial Williamsburg Foundation. 1973. ISBN 978-0-87935-002-4.
- Stephen Sayre: American Revolutionary Adventurer. Louisiana State University Press. 1983.
  - Alden, John Richard (March 1999). Stephen Sayre: American Revolutionary Adventurer. LSU Press. ISBN 9780807124185.
- George Washington: A Biography. Louisiana State University Press. 1984. ISBN 9780807141083.
