= Westville, Oklahoma =

Town in Oklahoma, US

Westville, Oklahoma ᎢᎪᏗ (Cherokee)
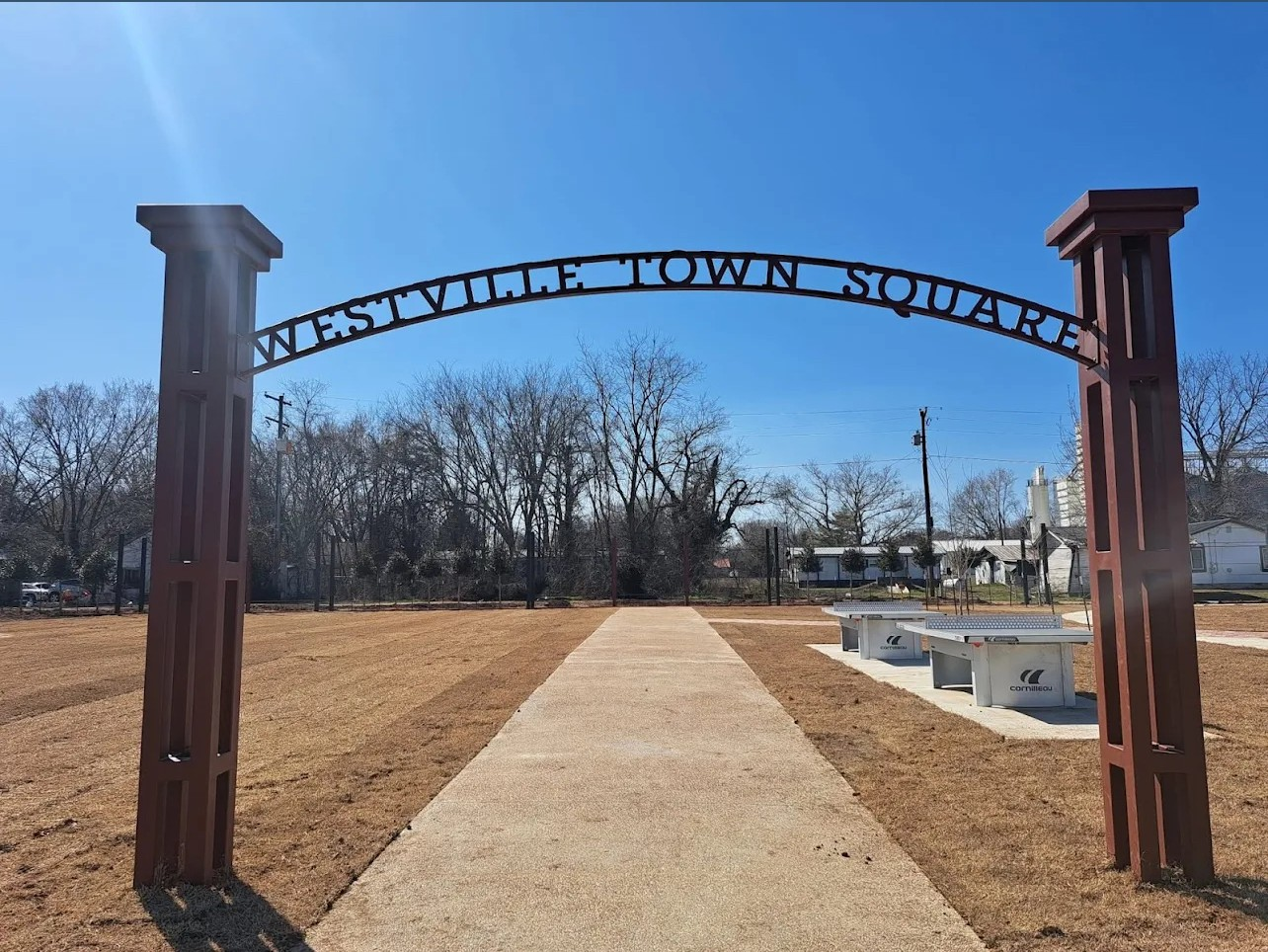
- Town Square Gateway

- Logo
- Motto: Golden Opportunities
- Location within Adair County, Cherokee Nation Reservation and the state of Oklahoma
- Coordinates: 35°59′28″N 94°34′30″W
- Country: United States
- State: Oklahoma
- County: Adair
- Incorporated: 1907
- Town Founded: November 18, 1895
- Named for: Jim West

Government
  - Type: Weak mayor
  - Body: Town Council of Westville
  - Mayor: Adam McKenzie

Area
  - Total: 1.80 sq mi (4.66 km^{2})
  - Land: 1.80 sq mi (4.66 km^{2})
  - Water: 0 sq mi (0.00 km^{2})
- Elevation: 1,152 ft (351 m)

Population (2020)
  - Total: 1,364
  - Density: 1,118.2/sq mi (431.74/km^{2})
- Time zone: UTC-6 (Central)
  - Summer (DST): UTC-5 (Central)
- ZIP code: 74965
- Area codes: 539/918
- FIPS code: 40-80450
- GNIS feature ID: 2413475
- Website: www.townofwestville.org

Westville (Cherokee: ᎢᎪᏗ, romanized: Igodi) is a town in Adair County, Oklahoma, located in the foothills of the Ozark Mountains. Westville lies at the junction of U.S. Highways 59 and 62, and approximately 13 miles north of Stilwell, the county seat. As of the 2020 census, Westville had a population of 1,364.

== History ==
Before statehood, Westville was a community in the Goingsnake District of the Cherokee Nation. The town was founded in 1895, when the Kansas City, Pittsburg and Gulf Railroad (later acquired by the Kansas City Southern Railroad) was constructing a rail line from Kansas City to the Gulf Coast. The Westville post office was established on November 18, 1895. The town name honored Jim West, who lived one mile south of nearby Cincinnati, Arkansas, and whose son, Jim West Jr., was an attorney for the Kansas City Southern Railway.

The original plat for the included 175 acres. Expansion came soon with the development of the William D. Williams addition and the Pat Dore Addition.

In 1902 a second rail line, the Ozark and Cherokee Central Railway, which ran from Fayetteville, Arkansas, to Okmulgee, Oklahoma, began operations through Westville, giving the town an enviable position at the rail junction. That line, later owned by St. Louis – San Francisco Railway, discontinued service to Westville in the late 1940s.

When Adair County was formed in 1907, Westville was identified as the county seat, due partly to its location at the intersection of two major railroads: the Kansas City Southern Railway and the St. Louis – San Francisco Railway. The county seat was moved to Stilwell in 1910.

== Geography ==
Westville is 13 miles (21 km) north of Stilwell and 15 miles (24 km) south of Siloam Springs, Arkansas.

According to the United States Census Bureau, the town has a total area of 1.2 square miles (3.1 km^{2}), all land.

Westville is located at the intersection of U.S. Routes 59 and 62.

== Demographics ==
Historical population
| Census | Pop. | Note | %± |
|---|---|---|---|
| 1900 | 296 | | — |
| 1910 | 802 | | 170.9% |
| 1920 | 956 | | 19.2% |
| 1930 | 691 | | −27.7% |
| 1940 | 716 | | 3.6% |
| 1950 | 781 | | 9.1% |
| 1960 | 727 | | −6.9% |
| 1970 | 934 | | 28.5% |
| 1980 | 1,049 | | 12.3% |
| 1990 | 1,374 | | 31.0% |
| 2000 | 1,596 | | 16.2% |
| 2010 | 1,632 | | 2.3% |
| 2020 | 1,364 | | −16.4% |
U.S. Decennial Census

=== 2020 census ===
As of the 2020 census, Westville had a population of 1,364. The median age was 35.3 years. 30.3% of residents were under the age of 18 and 15.2% of residents were 65 years of age or older. For every 100 females there were 87.6 males, and for every 100 females age 18 and over there were 84.7 males age 18 and over.

0.0% of residents lived in urban areas, while 100.0% lived in rural areas.

There were 537 households in Westville, of which 36.5% had children under the age of 18 living in them. Of all households, 34.6% were married-couple households, 20.7% were households with a male householder and no spouse or partner present, and 36.3% were households with a female householder and no spouse or partner present. About 30.7% of all households were made up of individuals and 14.2% had someone living alone who was 65 years of age or older.

There were 676 housing units, of which 20.6% were vacant. The homeowner vacancy rate was 4.9% and the rental vacancy rate was 17.0%.

Racial composition as of the 2020 census
| Race | Number | Percent |
|---|---|---|
| White | 678 | 49.7% |
| Black or African American | 1 | 0.1% |
| American Indian and Alaska Native | 438 | 32.1% |
| Asian | 8 | 0.6% |
| Native Hawaiian and Other Pacific Islander | 2 | 0.1% |
| Some other race | 29 | 2.1% |
| Two or more races | 208 | 15.2% |
| Hispanic or Latino (of any race) | 56 | 4.1% |

=== 2000 census ===
As of the census of 2000, there were 1,596 people, 599 households, and 401 families residing in the town. The population density was 1,324.1 inhabitants per square mile (511.2/km^{2}). There were 719 housing units at an average density of 596.5 per square mile (230.3/km^{2}). The racial makeup of the town was 62.41% White, 0.25% African American, 28.07% Native American, 0.31% Asian, 2.63% from other races, and 6.33% from two or more races. Hispanic or Latino of any race were 6.02% of the population.

There were 599 households, out of which 36.1% had children under the age of 18 living with them, 45.9% were married couples living together, 17.5% had a female householder with no husband present, and 32.9% were non-families. 28.7% of all households were made up of individuals, and 12.0% had someone living alone who was 65 years of age or older. The average household size was 2.57 and the average family size was 3.16.

In the town, the population was spread out, with 29.9% under the age of 18, 8.3% from 18 to 24, 25.8% from 25 to 44, 20.3% from 45 to 64, and 15.7% who were 65 years of age or older. The median age was 34 years. For every 100 females, there were 87.1 males. For every 100 females age 18 and over, there were 82.4 males.

The median income for a household in the town was $22,381, and the median income for a family was $28,882. Males had a median income of $25,729 versus $20,438 for females. The per capita income for the town was $11,055. About 16.1% of families and 22.3% of the population were below the poverty line, including 24.0% of those under age 18 and 19.0% of those age 65 or over.

== Government ==
Westville has a Mayor-Council form of Government, which contains five member on the Town Council. Departments of the Town that report to the Council include the Police Department, Volunteer Fire Department, Office of Emergency Management, Street Department, and Town Clerk's Office.

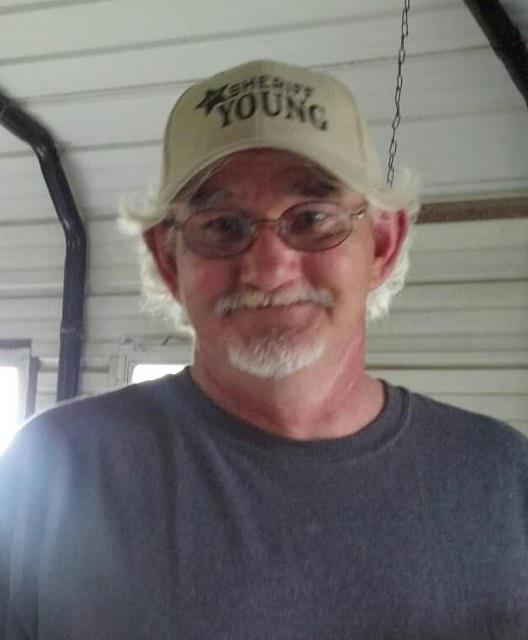
Mayor Adam McKenzie

Mayor Adam McKenzie was appointed interim mayor in 2021 when former Mayor Tony Barker stepped down from his position on the Council. After public election in 2022, new council member Chris Null was elected to finish the remainder of Barker's term. McKenzie was then confirmed to be the mayor at the following council meeting.

=== Council Members ===
- Mayor, Adam McKenzie (Re-elected 2023)
- Vice Mayor, Chris Null (Re-elected 2023)
- Councilman, Stefanie Mitchell (Re-elected 2025)
- Councilman, Michael Leach (Elected 2023)
- Councilman, Christina Hanvey (Elected 2025)

== NRHP Sites ==
Sites in Westville listed on the National Register of Historic Places include:

- The Buffington Hotel, on Main St.
- The Rev. Jesse Bushyhead Grave, which has a 15-foot-tall (4.6 m) marble monument to the Cherokee religious and political leader, in the Baptist Mission Cemetery off State Highway 59
- The Opera Block (on Main St. but since demolished)
- The Ballard Creek Roadbed (relevant to the Cherokee Trail of Tears, address restricted)
- Breadtown (relevant to the Cherokee Trail of Tears, address restricted)

== Education ==
It is in the Westville Public Schools school district.

== Notable people ==
- Thomas Buffington, Cherokee chief from 1899 to 1903
- Markwayne Mullin, United States Senator from Oklahoma and former United States Representative
- Jim Ross, World Wrestling Entertainment commentator
- Tom Woods, politician
