= National Register of Historic Places listings in Cherokee County, Oklahoma =

Location of Cherokee County in Oklahoma

This is a list of the National Register of Historic Places listings in Cherokee County, Oklahoma.

This is intended to be a complete list of the properties and districts on the National Register of Historic Places in Cherokee County, Oklahoma, United States. The locations of National Register properties and districts for which the latitude and longitude coordinates are included below, may be seen in a map.

There are 21 properties and districts listed on the National Register in the county, including 2 National Historic Landmarks.

This National Park Service list is complete through NPS recent listings posted March 21, 2025.

== Current listings ==
	Name on the Register	Image	Date listed	Location	City or town	Description
1	Alston-Bedwell House	Alston-Bedwell House	September 8, 2005 (#05001002)	315 N. State; 35°55′00″N 94°58′28″W	Tahlequah	
2	American Baptist Home Mission House		September 3, 2010 (#10000621)	530 Summit St. 35°55′10″N 94°58′26″W	Tahlequah	
3	American Legion Hut	American Legion Hut	August 24, 2006 (#06000798)	Tehlequah City Park, junction of E. Shawnee St. and N. Brookside Ave. 35°54′47″N 94°58′03″W	Tahlequah	
4	Cherokee Female Seminary	Cherokee Female Seminary	April 5, 1973 (#73001558)	Northeastern State University campus 35°55′13″N 94°58′12″W	Tahlequah	
5	Cherokee National Capitol	Cherokee National Capitol	October 15, 1966 (#66000627)	Eastern side of Muskogee Ave. between Keetoowah and Delaware Sts. 35°54′45″N 94°58′14″W	Tahlequah	
6	Cherokee National Jail	Cherokee National Jail	June 28, 1974 (#74001656)	Choctaw St. and Water Ave. 35°54′43″N 94°58′02″W	Tahlequah	
7	Cherokee Supreme Court Building	Cherokee Supreme Court Building	June 28, 1974 (#74001657)	Keetoowah St. and Water Ave. 35°54′47″N 94°58′00″W	Tahlequah	
8	First Cherokee Female Seminary Site	First Cherokee Female Seminary Site	April 30, 1974 (#74001658)	21191 S. Keeler Dr. 35°51′59″N 94°57′11″W	Park Hill	
9	M.E. Franklin House	M.E. Franklin House	September 5, 2006 (#06000791)	415 N. College Ave. 35°55′03″N 94°58′13″W	Tahlequah	
10	French-Parks House	French-Parks House	March 18, 1985 (#85000618)	209 W. Keetoowah St. 35°54′45″N 94°58′23″W	Tahlequah	
11	Illinois Campground	Illinois Campground	December 6, 2004 (#04001330)	County Road DO775; 35°53′42″N 94°57′38″W	Tahlequah	
12	Indian University of Tahlequah	Indian University of Tahlequah	July 6, 1976 (#76001557)	320 Academy; 35°55′05″N 94°58′20″W	Tahlequah	
13	Dr. Irwin D. Loeser Log Cabin	Dr. Irwin D. Loeser Log Cabin	November 17, 1978 (#78002221)	121 E. Smith St. 35°55′05″N 94°58′02″W	Tahlequah	
14	Leonard M. Logan House		October 12, 2005 (#05001165)	531 Summit; 35°55′08″N 94°58′26″W	Tahlequah	
15	Murrell Home	Murrell Home	June 22, 1970 (#70000530)	19479 East Murrel Road; 35°50′57″N 94°57′51″W	Park Hill	
16	Park Hill Mission Cemetery	Park Hill Mission Cemetery	December 6, 2006 (#06001113)	South Park Hill Rd., 0.5 miles south of East Murrell Rd. 35°50′58″N 94°57′57″W	Park Hill	
17	Rosamund	Rosamund	September 6, 2006 (#06000793)	527 Seminary Ave. 35°55′05″N 94°58′14″W	Tahlequah	
18	Ross Cemetery	Ross Cemetery	March 7, 2002 (#02000170)	0.5 miles south of the junction of Murrell Rd. and N4530 Rd. 35°51′03″N 94°56′53″W	Park Hill	
19	Tahlequah Armory	Tahlequah Armory	May 20, 1994 (#94000488)	100 Water Ave. 35°54′47″N 94°58′08″W	Tahlequah	
20	Tahlequah Carnegie Library	Tahlequah Carnegie Library	June 5, 2003 (#03000516)	120 S. College; 35°54′48″N 94°58′22″W	Tahlequah	
21	Joseph M. Thompson House	Joseph M. Thompson House	March 11, 1993 (#93000155)	300 S. College Ave. 35°54′48″N 94°58′33″W	Tahlequah	

== See also ==
- List of National Historic Landmarks in Oklahoma
- National Register of Historic Places listings in Oklahoma
