= List of the oldest buildings in Oklahoma =

This article lists the oldest extant buildings in Oklahoma, including extant buildings and structures constructed prior to and during the United States rule over Oklahoma. Only buildings built prior to 1870 are suitable for inclusion on this list, or the building must be the oldest of its type.

In order to qualify for the list, a structure must:

- be a recognizable building (defined as any human-made structure used or intended for supporting or sheltering any use or continuous occupancy);
- incorporate features of building work from the claimed date to at least 1.5 metres (4.9 ft) in height and/or be a listed building.

This consciously excludes ruins of limited height, roads and statues. Bridges may be included if they otherwise fulfill the above criteria. Dates for many of the oldest structures have been arrived at by radiocarbon dating or dendrochronology and should be considered approximate. If the exact year of initial construction is estimated, it will be shown as a range of dates.

== List of oldest buildings ==
Building	Image	Location	First built	Use	Notes
Sequoyah's Cabin		Sequoyah County, Oklahoma	1829	House	The oldest house in the state of Oklahoma and the home of Sequoyah creator of Cherokee syllabary.
Dictrict Choctaw Chief's House		Swink, Oklahoma	1837	House	the oldest house in the state of Oklahoma that remains on its original site; built of logs
Cherokee National Supreme Court Museum		Tahlequah, Oklahoma	1844	Government	Tribal Supreme Court building, possibly the oldest building completed in OK
Murrell Home		Park Hill, Oklahoma	1844	House	Historic plantation house
Barracks at Fort Gibson		Fort Gibson, Oklahoma	1844-1867	Fort	
Judge Franklin Faulkner House		Sallisaw, Oklahoma	1845	House	
Wheelock Church		Millerton, Oklahoma	1845-1846	Church	Choctaw stone church, oldest church building in OK
Edwards Store		Latimer County, Oklahoma	c. 1850	Residence/Commercial	listed on National Register of Historic Places
Cherokee National Capitol		Tahlequah, Oklahoma	1867-1869	Government	Cherokee National Capitol, now the Cherokee Nation Courthouse
Cherokee National Jail		Tahlequah, Oklahoma	1874	Jail	In use until 1970s. Oldest jail building in Oklahoma

== See also ==
- National Register of Historic Places listings in Oklahoma
- History of Oklahoma
- Oldest buildings in the United States
