= Jennie Ross Cobb =

Cherokee curator and photographer (1881–1959)

- Born: Jennie Fields Ross; December 26, 1881; Tahlequah, Cherokee Nation, Indian Territory
- Died: January 19, 1959 (aged 77); Tahlequah, Oklahoma
- Citizenship: American, Cherokee Nation
- Education: self-taught
- Known for: Native American photography

Jennie Ross Cobb (Cherokee, 1881–1959) is the first known Native American woman photographer in the United States. She began taking pictures of her Cherokee community in the late 19th century. The Oklahoma Historical Society used her photos of the Murrell Home to restore that building, which is now a museum. Trained as a teacher, Cobb worked as a florist in Texas before returning to Oklahoma to spearhead the restoration of the Murrell Home.

== Early life ==
Jennie Fields Ross was born on December 26, 1881 in Tahlequah, Cherokee Nation, Indian Territory to Fannie D. (née Thornton) and Robert Bruce Ross. She was named after her father's mother, Jennie Fields and was a great-granddaughter of Cherokee Chief John Ross. Her father was treasurer of the Cherokee National Council and served in other tribal administration capacities, as well as farming on the Ross homestead near Park Hill.

During her teenage years, Ross spent much time among the various Ross relatives in Park Hill. The family lived in the "Hunter's Home," now known as the Murrell Home, and Jennie, an amateur photographer, took photographs of the house, surrounding areas and her school mates. She began taking pictures around 1896 and continued until around 1903, developing her photographs in a closet at the Murrell Home. The images "defied the stereotypical photographic views" of Native Americans at the time, showing that the Cherokee were educated, fashionable, and proud of their culture. Ross attended school at the Cherokee Female Seminary, which had been rebuilt in 1889 and may have graduated in 1900 or 1902.

== Career ==
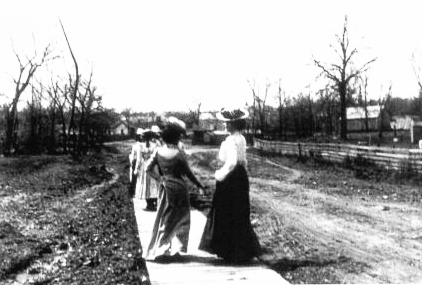
Cherokee Female Seminary students stroll along boardwalk that led from school into Tahlequah, photograph by Jennie Ross Cobb, ca. 1902, collection of the Oklahoma Historical Society

After completing her own studies, Ross became a teacher at the Cherokee school in Paw Paw. She married Jesse Clifton "J. C." Cobb in 1905 and they subsequently had one child, a daughter named Jenevieve in 1906.

In 1928, the family moved to Arlington, Texas, and by the early 1930s, Cobb was running a floral shop business called the Flower Market. J.C. was an engineer in the oil business. After his death in 1940, she and Jenevieve worked together in the florist shop. Cobb was involved with the rose garden in Arlington's Meadowbrook Park. She and Jenevieve worked with the Arlington Garden Club to help them win an award from Woman's Home Companion in a contest. Jenevieve died on August 8, 1945, in Arlington and Cobb took her two grandchildren, Jennifer and Cliff Biggers, to raise.

In 1952, Cobb left Arlington and returned to Oklahoma to help restore the Murrell Home. Armed with her photographs from the turn of the century and her memories, Cobb assisted restoration experts to creating a more accurate version of the home. Pilings which indicated a wrap-around porch had once been there were shown to be a later addition and not restored. She supervised gathering furnishings and artifacts from Ross family members and other Cherokee families, overseeing the opening of the museum.

== Death and legacy ==
Cobb died from a heart attack on January 19, 1959, at a hospital in Tahlequah and was buried beside her husband and daughter at Rose Hill Cemetery in Arlington, Texas.

Cobb is often credited with being the first, first woman, or one of the first, Native American photographers in the United States. The Oklahoma Historical Society maintains the Jennie Ross Cobb Collection of photographs, which has toured in several exhibitions through the years, such as the 1995 Photographers in Petticoats: Oklahoma Territories 1890-1907 exhibition at the Pioneer Woman Museum in Ponca City and a traveling exhibition called Our People, Our Land, Our Images: International Indigenous Photography, curated by Hulleah J. Tsinhnahjinnie (Diné/Muscogee/Seminole) and Veronica Passalacqua, which has toured the country since 2007. The University of Oklahoma Libraries' Western History Collections also has a collection of her documents relating to the restoration of the Murrell Home and other Ross family memorabilia. The Cherokee National History Museum featured her work in a 2020-21 exhibition, “Through the Lens: The Photographic Legacy of Jennie Ross Cobb,” noting: "Informal, casual and unguarded, Jennie’s images resonate with viewers today. They tell the story of her unique experience as a young woman from a highly influential and progressive Cherokee family in those golden days before statehood swept over Indian Territory."

== See also ==
- Photography by indigenous peoples of the Americas
