= Kiowa phonology =

The most thorough treatment of the Kiowa sound system is by Laurel Watkins in a generative framework. A consideration of prosodic phenomena with acoustic analysis is in Sivertsen (1956). Earlier discussions of phonemics are Trager (1960), Merrifield (1959), Wonderly et al. (1954), and Harrington (1928).

== Segments ==
=== Consonants ===
The 23 consonants of Kiowa:

		Bilabial	Dental	Alveolar	Palatal	Velar	Glottal
Nasal		m	n				
Stop	voiced	b	d			ɡ	
Stop	voiceless	p	t	ts		k	ʔ
Stop	aspirated	pʰ	tʰ			kʰ	
Stop	ejective	pʼ	tʼ	tsʼ		kʼ	
Fricative	voiced			z			
Fricative	voiceless			s	ç		h
Approximant		(w)	l		j		

In the orthography (used here) of native Kiowa speaker Dane Poolaw, these are represented as below (parenthetic letters are used only at the end of the syllable):

		Bilabial	Dental	Alveolar	Palatal	Velar	Glottal
Nasal		m	n				
Stop	voiced	b	d			g	
Stop	voiceless	b̶ ([b)	d̶ ([d)	ts		g̶ ([g)	(t)
Stop	aspirated	p	t			k	
Stop	ejective	pʼ	tʼ	tsʼ		kʼ	
Fricative	voiced			z			
Fricative	voiceless			s	sy		h
Approximant		w	l		y		

- The labio-velar glide [w] is only found in Comanche loanwords or in some interjections like [wéː] (an expression used to welcome travelers). A phonetic [w] offglide also occurs after the mid back vowel /o/.
- The palatal fricative ç is found only in two cognate roots, the singular and nonsingular suppletive pair for 'small', syáun [çɔ̃́n] and syân [çæ̃̂n] (as well as in their derivatives, like the adverbials syáundé 'a little', syândè 'in small portions'). The pronunciation [sj] is occasionally heard for ⟨sy⟩, suggesting that [ç] might arise by assimilation from /sj/.
- Voiceless /p, t/ when followed by another consonant (and, thus, also syllable-final) are typically reduced to a glottal stop [ʔ]. In careful speech, the bilabial and dental articulations are preserved. Example: bat b̶ā́u /batpɔ́ː/ ('eat' imperfective, 2nd person singular') is [baʔpɔ́ː] in casual speech.
- Ejectives /pʼ, tʼ, tsʼ, kʼ/ are strongly articulated.
- Glottal stops.
  - The glottal stop /ʔ/ is typically deleted in normal speech. However, in carefully articulated citation forms, the glottal stop is retained. For example, the word pʼáuā́u /pʼɔ̃́ʔɔ̃́ː/ ('wash') is usually pronounced [pʼɔ̃́ː] in connected speech.
  - Phonetic glottal stops are also automatically inserted after morpheme-final short vowels before concatenation.
  - Other phonetic glottal stops are allophones of syllable-final oral stops /p, t/ (see above) or a phonation effect of the falling tone.
- Velar consonants palatalize before the low front vowel /a/. This vowel then fronts further to [æ] (see Vowels below). Being automatic (like aspiration in English), this palatalization is not indicated in McKenzie's orthography. Examples with all four velars are: kʼám [kʲʼæ̃́m] ('lazy'), g̶áp [kʲǽp] ('onwards'), kál [kʲʰǽᵈl] ('wet'), -gà [ɡʲæ] ('in'). (Exceptions to this rule arise only in loanwords and are indicated by an apostrophe: g̶'ā́bòlī̀ [káːbòlìː] 'sheep', g̶'átlìn [kǽtlɪ̃n] 'sharpshooter'.)
- The dental sonorants /n, l/ were palatalized [nʲ, lʲ] before the high front vowel /i/ in previous generations, though this is not generally heard in current elder's speech: bṓnî /bṍːnîː/ ('see' (imperfective hearsay) pronounced as [bṍːwnʲĩ̂ː], tàlī́ /tʰàlíː/ ('boy') pronounced as [tʰàlʲíː].
- Lateral /l/ is slightly affricated at the end of syllables as [ᵈl]. At the end of utterances, the affricate is partially devoiced. Examples: gúldā̀u /ɡúldɔ̀ː/ ('to be red') pronounced as [ɡúᵈldɔ̀ː], sál /sál/ ('to be hot') pronounced as [sáᵈ̥l].
- The nasality of the vowels spreads onto following offglides: káui /kʰɔ̃́j/ ('bark, rind') is [kʰɔ̃́ȷ̃].

=== Vowels ===
Kiowa has six contrasting vowel qualities with three heights and a front-back distinction. Additionally, there is an oral-nasal contrast on all six vowels. For example, nasality is the only difference between ā́u /ʔɔ́ː/ ('to gamble') and ā́u /ʔɔ̃́ː/ ('to give').

Oral vowels
	Front	Back
High	i	u
Mid	e	o
Low	a	ɔ

Nasal vowels
	Front	Back
High	ĩ	ũ
Mid	ẽ	õ
Low	ã	ɔ̃

The oral-nasal contrast, however, is neutralized in the environment of nasal consonants, where only nasalized vowels occur. Watkins phonemicizes an oral vowel in these contexts: mā́ /máː/ ('up') is phonetically [mã́ː], máun /mɔ́n/ ('probably') is phonetically [mɔ̃́n].

Kiowa vowels have an underlying two-way length contrast (short vs. long). However, a number of phonological issues restrict the length contrast. (See the syllable and phonotactics for details.)

- The high vowels /i, u/ are lowered to [ɪ, ʊ] when they occur before nasal consonants /m, n/: bímkàui /bímkʰɔ̀j/ ('bag') is phonetically [bɪ̃́mkʰɔ̀j], gún /ɡún/ ('to dance' perfective) is phonetically [ɡʊ̃́n].
- Long mid vowels /eː, oː/ are followed by homorganic offglides: hḗbà /héːbà/ ('to enter') is pronounced as [héːjbà], d̶ṓcà /tóːkià/ ('at the house') is phonetically [tóːwkjæ̀]. The offglides are considered sub-phonemic as they are predictable.
- Low /ɔ/ is only slightly rounded — its position varying between lower-mid to low [ɔ~ɒ]. When it is short and in open syllables, it is centralized approaching central [ɞ]: dàub̶ôm /dɔ̀pôm/ ('despicable') → [dɞ̀pôm] .
- The /a/ of the diphthong /ia/ is fronted and raised when long as [æː] and is raised further when it precedes a nasal consonant: kʼā́hĩ̂ /kʼiã́ːhĩ̂ː/ ('man') → [kʼjæ̃́ːhĩ̂ː], kʼám /kʼiám/ ('to be lazy') → [kʼjɛ̃́m].
- Vowel length is only contrastive in open syllables. Closed syllables only have phonetic short vowels. Underlying long vowels are shortened in this position (note morphophonemic alternations).

=== Tone ===
Kiowa has three tones: high, low, falling. No minimal triple is available, but the distinctions can be illustrated pairwise: à ~ á (agreement prefixes for 1sg and 3pl unaccusatives), ḕ ('when') ~ ḗ ('here'); àl ('also)' ~ âl ('chase' perfective imperative), tsḕ ('when') ~ tsê ('horse'); g̶ául ('cattle')~ g̶âul ('some'), gṹ('wise') ~ gû ('hit'). Note that length is not indicated on vowels with falling tone in the current orthography: this is because falling tone is generally only realized over long vowels or a vowel plus resonant (/j/, /l/, /m/, or /n/). However, there are at least two words with falling tone realized before /t/, both of them minimally contrastive with high tone: bót ('guts') ~ bôt ('because'), tsát ('door') ~ tsât ('cheque'). This behaviour contrasts with /p/; suffixation of /p/ to verbs with falling tone causes the vowel to shorten and become simply high, as in root ~ perfective pairs gû ~ góp ('hit'), kî ~ tép ('exit'). One speaker has been recorded with the pronunciation [êtʼ] ('big') in contrast to other speakers' [ét] (the compounding form, êl, as in êlmā̀ 'old woman', has falling tone).

The falling tone has glottalized realizations (creaky voice, tense voice, with glottal stop) in some contexts.

There are also a number of tone sandhi effects.

=== Syllable and phonotactics ===
Surface syllables in Kiowa must consist of a vowel nucleus. Syllable onsets are optional and can consist of single consonant or a consonant followed by a palatal glide [j]. A single vowel may be followed by an optional syllable coda consonant or the vowel may optionally be long. Thus, the following syllables are found in Kiowa: V, CV, CjV, VC, CVC, CjVC, Vː, CVː, CjVː. This can be succinctly represented as the syllable equation below.

$$\left ( C \right ) \left ( j \right ) V \left ( \begin{Bmatrix}
C \\
\text{ː}
\end{Bmatrix} \right ) + Tone$$

A number of phonotactic restrictions are found limiting the possible combinations of sounds. These are discussed below.

Onset. All consonants can occurs as a single consonant onset. However, /l/ only occurs word-initially in loan words (e.g., láyàn 'lion', Láut 'Lawton').

Nucleus. The syllable nucleus can be any vowel, which can be either short or long.

Coda. The coda position may be filled only by /p, t, m, n, l, j/. Palatal /j/ only follows the vowels /u, o, ɔ, a/ (i.e. the palatal may not occur after non-low front vowels).

== See also ==
- Kiowa language

== Bibliography ==
- Harrington, John P. (1928). Vocabulary of the Kiowa language. Smithsonian Institution Bureau of American Ethnology. Vol. 34. Washington: US Government Printing Office. OL 6735322M.
- Merrifield, William R. (Jul 1959). "The Kiowa verb prefix". International Journal of American Linguistics. 25 (3): 168–176. doi:10.1086/464523. S2CID 144102437.
- Silvertsen, Eva (Apr 1956). "Pitch problems in Kiowa". International Journal of American Linguistics. 22 (2): 117–130. doi:10.1086/464356. S2CID 144110239.
- Trager, Edith C. (1960). The Kiowa language: A grammatical study (PhD thesis). University of Pennsylvania.
- Watkins, Laurel J.; McKenzie, Parker (1984). A grammar of Kiowa. Studies in the anthropology of North American Indians. Lincoln: University of Nebraska Press. ISBN 0-8032-4727-3.
- Wonderly, William L.; Gibson, Lorna F.; Kirk, Paul L. (Jan 1954). "Number in Kiowa: Nouns, demonstratives, and adjectives". International Journal of American Linguistics. 20 (1): 1–7. doi:10.1086/464244. S2CID 144480683.
