= Jimalee Burton =

Jimalee Chitwood Burton Ho-Chee-Nee
- Born: January 23, 1906; El Reno, Oklahoma Territory
- Died: 2000
- Spouse: Dan Burton (m. 1933; died 1954)

Jimalee Chitwood Burton (née Jimalee Chitwood, January 23, 1906 – 2000), also known as Ho-Chee-Nee, was an American writer, artist, and lecturer who claimed Creek-Cherokee ancestry.

== Early life ==
Jimalee Chitwood was born on January 23, 1906, in El Reno, Oklahoma Territory, (Note: According to the Encyclopedia of Indians of the Americas (1979); however, other sources simply state that she was born in 1920.) the first child of James Alexander Chitwood and Mary Caroline Burger Chitwood. Her father, whom Burton identified as being of Cherokee descent, was as a rider for the Pony Express and had moved from Texas to Oklahoma Territory during the Land Rush of 1889. Burton identified her mother as being of Creek and Cherokee descent.

== Career ==
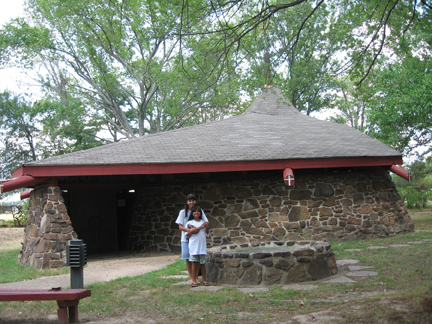
The Ho-Chee-Nee Chapel at the Cherokee Heritage Center in Park Hill, Oklahoma.

In 1949, Burton's oil painting Buffalo Dance was showcased at the Philbrook Museum of Art's annual Native American painting competition. She became the first woman to exhibit at the event and also received the "Third Purchase Prize for the Woodland Region". How the Boy Medicine Came to the Kiowas, an oil painting on canvas that was completed by Burton in the "mid-20th century", is now housed at the Gilcrease Museum in Tulsa, Oklahoma.

Burton was also a prolific writer. In 1979, Burton's anthology of poems, prose, and traditional stories, titled Indian Heritage, Indian Pride: Stories That Touched My Life, was released by the University of Oklahoma Press. She pledged all of her royalties to the construction of a Cherokee chapel; the Cherokee Heritage Center Memorial Chapel in Park Hill, Oklahoma was erected in 1976. Burton also edited The Native Voice for fifteen years.

== Personal life and death ==
Jimalee Chitwood married radio personality Dan "Smiling Dan" Burton (October 1, 1889 – May 10, 1954) in 1933 until his death. The couple did not have any children together, although Dan Burton had a son from a previous marriage.
