= Longhorn Mountain =

Mountain in Oklahoma, United States

- Location within Oklahoma

Highest point
- Elevation: 1,946 ft (593 m)
- Coordinates: 34°55′29″N 98°44′52″W

Naming
- Native name: Gúñ:g̶í:nyík’òp (Kiowa)

Geography
- Location: Kiowa County, Oklahoma, United States

Longhorn Mountain (Kiowa: Gúñ:g̶í:nyík’òp) is a mountain in Kiowa County, Oklahoma, United States. It is sacred to the Kiowa people and has been threatened by gravel mining since 2013.
