= Cherokee National Supreme Court Museum =

- Cherokee Supreme Court Building
- U.S. National Register of Historic Places
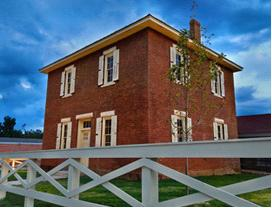

- Location within Oklahoma
- Location: Keetoowah St. and Water Ave., Tahlequah, Oklahoma
- Coordinates: 35°54′47″N 94°58′00″W
- Area: less than one acre
- Built: 1844
- NRHP reference No.: 74001657
- Added to NRHP: June 28, 1974

Cherokee Supreme Court Building (also known as Cherokee County School) is museum at Keetoowah Street and Water Avenue in Tahlequah, Oklahoma. The building was constructed in 1844 and it was added the National Register of Historic Places in 1974. It is the oldest government building in Oklahoma and possibly the oldest building still surviving in the state.

The building that once housed the Supreme Court of the Cherokee Nation has been converted into a museum, the Cherokee National Supreme Court Museum and is open to the public. It reportedly is the oldest public building in Oklahoma. (Note: The museum is normally open 10 AM - 4 PM, Monday through Friday. The street address is 122 East Keetowah Street, Tahlequah.) It was constructed on the southeast corner of the town square by James S. Pierce in 1844. The first chief justice of the Cherokee Nation, John Martin (judge) (1784–1840) held court here. The printing press for the early-day Cherokee Phoenix newspaper was also located in this building, and a reproduction of the press and the newsroom can be seen here.

== See also ==
- List of the oldest buildings in Oklahoma
