= Cherokee National Prison Museum =

- U.S. National Register of Historic Places
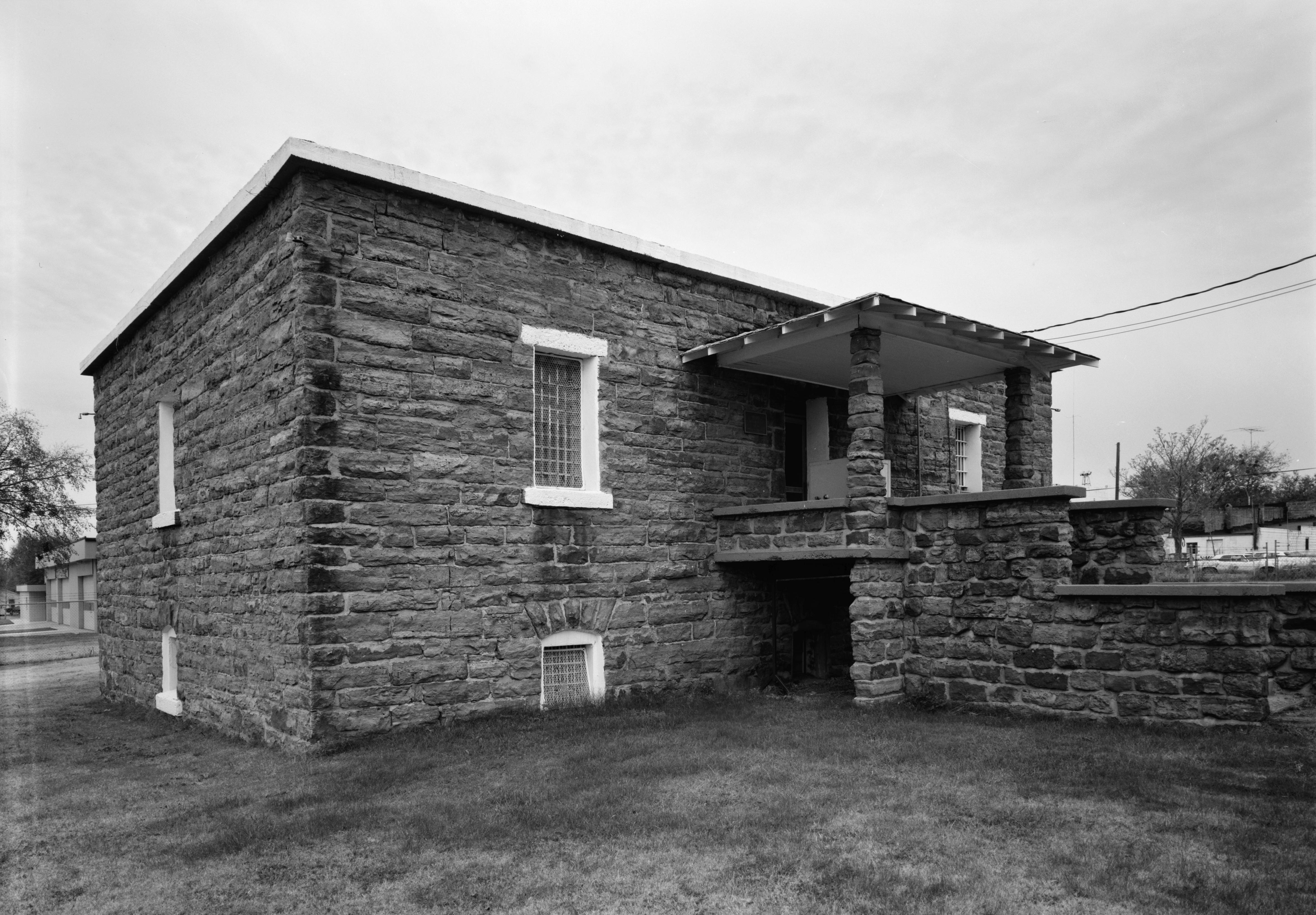
- Cherokee National Jail in 1979

- Location within Oklahoma Location within the United States
- Location: Choctaw St. and Water Ave., Tahlequah, Oklahoma
- Coordinates: 35°54′43″N 94°58′2″W
- Area: less than one acre
- Built: 1874
- NRHP reference No.: 74001656
- Added to NRHP: June 28, 1974

The Cherokee National Prison Museum, formerly the Cherokee National Jail or Cherokee National Penitentiary (Cherokee: Ꮳꮃꭹ Ꭼꮎꮥꮎ Ꮧꮣꮝꮪꭹ), was built in 1874 as part of a governmental complex for the Cherokee Nation in Tahlequah, Oklahoma. It served the Cherokee Nation until it was sold to Cherokee County, Oklahoma, which used it as a jail into the 1970s.

The prison, as built in 1874 for $6000, was a two-story building with a basement. The sandstone structure measures 48 feet (15 m) by 35 feet (11 m). The second floor has been removed and replaced with a flat roof. There are two sandstone porches on the main level, front and back, with hipped roofs. The Cherokee National Jail was placed on the National Register of Historic Places on June 28, 1974. The jail is now a museum, named the Cherokee National Prison Museum.

== See also ==
- Oldest buildings in Oklahoma
- Cherokee National Museum
