= First Cherokee Female Seminary Site =

- First Cherokee Female Seminary site
- U.S. National Register of Historic Places
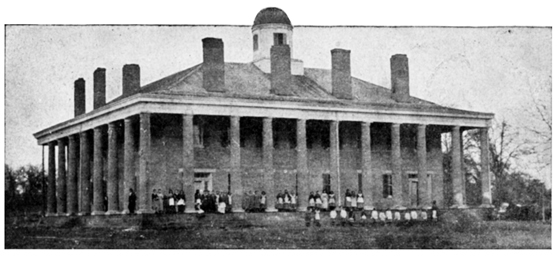
- Location: Park Hill, Oklahoma, United States
- Coordinates: 35.867465°, -94.955904
- Built: 1851
- Architectural style: Classical Revival
- Demolished: 1887
- NRHP reference No.: 74001658
- Added to NRHP: 1973

The first Cherokee Female Seminary was a boarding school opened by the Cherokee Nation in 1851 in Park Hill, Oklahoma. On Easter Sunday 1887, a fire burned the building, but the head of the school, Florence Wilson, made sure all the girls got out. Two years later, in 1889, the new Cherokee Female Seminary reopened and still stands just north of Tahlequah.

Today the Cherokee Heritage Center stands on the grounds of the original Cherokee Female Seminary. The only Classical Revival architecture features to survive the 1887 fire, the school's columns still stand today and are surrounded by roses.

== See also ==
- Cherokee Male Seminary
