= Rainy Mountain =

Coordinates: 34.997003°N 98.849513°W

Rainy Mountain (Kiowa: Sépyáldà) is a rounded hill standing northwest apart from the main Wichita Mountains in Kiowa County, Oklahoma. It was a prominent landmark for the Plains Indians on the southern plains. The PBS video https://www.pbs.org/video/n-scott-momaday-word-from-a-bear-odljy7/ provides additional historical information regarding the site.

Rainy Mountain Creek, flowing northeastward from Rainy Mountain, was a favored winter camp for Plains Indians, especially the Kiowas, because the grass was green even in winter. The creek is the primary waterway of the Rainy Mountain Creek Watershed which was subject to severe annual flooding. In the years from 1926 to 1945 there were 52 major floods and 61 smaller floods. In 1960 the Kiowa County, Washita County and Mountain View Conservation Districts, in conjunction with the Soil Conservation Service (now the Natural Resources Conservation Service), implemented a project to construct 29 flood control dams known as the Rainy Mountain Creek Watershed Project.

== Sources ==
- Momaday, N. Scott. The Way to Rainy Mountain. Albuquerque: University of New Mexico Press, (reprint edition) 1998. ISBN 0-8263-0436-2
- Nye, Wilbur Sturtevant, Col. Carbine & Lance: The Story of Old Fort Sill. Norman: University of Oklahoma Press, (revised edition), 1969. ISBN 0-8061-0856-8
- Oklahoma Conservation Commission. "Rainy Mountain Creek Watershed Project. 2011. pdf
