= Murrell Home =

Historic house in Oklahoma, United States

- Hunter's Home
- U.S. National Register of Historic Places
- U.S. National Historic Landmark
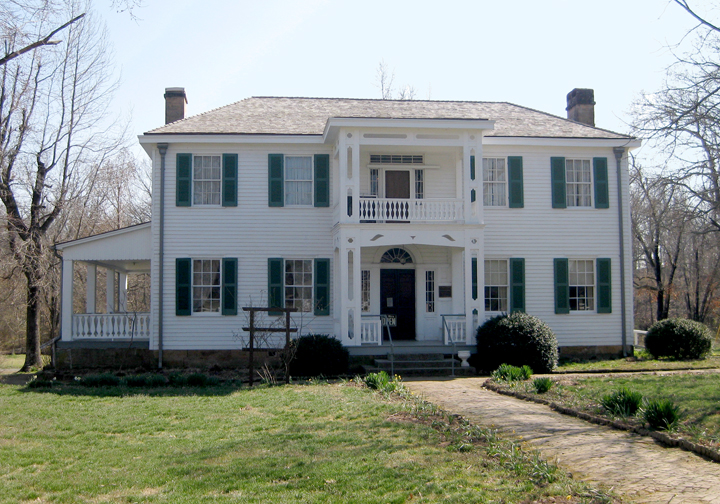
- Hunter's Home

- Location within Oklahoma
- Location: Park Hill, Oklahoma
- Coordinates: 35°51′21″N 94°57′32″W
- Built: 1844–45
- Architectural style: Federal
- NRHP reference No.: 70000530

Significant dates
- Added to NRHP: June 22, 1970
- Designated NHL: May 30, 1974

The Hunter's Home, formerly known as the George M. Murrell Home, is a historic house museum at 19479 E Murrel Rd in Park Hill, near Tahlequah, Oklahoma in the Cherokee Nation. Built in 1845, it is one of the few buildings to survive in Cherokee lands from the antebellum period between the Trail of Tears relocation of the Cherokee people and the American Civil War. It was a major social center of the elite among the Cherokee in the mid-nineteenth century. It has been owned by the state since 1948, and was designated a National Historic Landmark in 1974.

== History ==
The mansion was built by George Michael Murrell, a wealthy white planter and merchant married to Minerva Ross, the niece of prominent Cherokee leader John Ross. He called it Hunter's Home due to his fondness for the fox hunt. The Murrells came to Indian Territory about the time of the Trail of Tears (1839). They furnished their house with the latest in fashions. They held 42 enslaved people, whom they housed in nine cabins on the large property.

During the American Civil War, the area surrounding Hunter's Home was frequently raided by forces loyal to both the Union and Confederacy. The home was spared destruction during this turbulent time and was the only local building to survive the conflict.

Cherokee Jennie Ross Cobb (1881–1959), one of the earliest Native American photographers, later lived in Hunter's Home and helped direct restoration of the house. The house was declared a National Historic Landmark in 1974.

The building was acquired by the state in 1948, and is operated by the Oklahoma Historical Society as a historic house museum. It has been furnished reflecting the period 1830s-1860s, including furnishings and artifacts from the Murrell family. The Daniel Cabin is a log cabin on the property; it is used for living history demonstrations of Cherokee life in the 1850s. In 2018 the name was officially changed from Murrell Home to Hunter's Home.

== See also ==
- Cherokee Nation (19th century)
- List of National Historic Landmarks in Oklahoma
- National Register of Historic Places listings in Cherokee County, Oklahoma
