= Parker McKenzie =

Kiowa Native American linguist (1897–1999)

Parker Paul McKenzie (Kiowa: Yí:sàum)(November 15, 1897, near Rainy Mountain, Indian Territory – March 5, 1999, Mountain View, Oklahoma) was a Kiowa Native American linguist, who developed the Kiowa language orthography.

== Early life ==
McKenzie was born in a tipi, and baptized in the Washita River. He was educated at the Rainy Mountain Kiowa Boarding School, where it was mandatory to speak the English Language; those who used the Kiowa language were threatened with physical punishment. Afterwards, he attended the Phoenix Indian School, Union High School, Lamson College, and Oklahoma State University.

McKenzie attended the Phoenix Indian School with Nettie Odlety (c. 1896 – 1978), whom he married on August 23, 1919. At school the couple wrote each other letters in Kiowa. They also were some of the earliest Kiowa photographers, taking photographs in Arizona in 1916.

== Linguistic work ==
When in 1918 the Smithsonian Institution sent the anthropologist John Peabody Harrington to Oklahoma to study the language of the Kiowa, McKenzie was his translator. This began a decades-long scientific examination and recording of the Kiowa language, which until then had been purely an oral language. They jointly developed a valid phonetic alphabet, which also resulted in the publication of Vocabulary of the Kiowa Language (1928) and Popular Account of the Kiowa Indian Language (1948), in a collaboration that extended into the 1950s. All this time, from the 1920s to the 1950s, McKenzie, never an academic, was a stenographer in the Indians Monies Section of the Bureau of Indian Affairs.

Late in his life, in close cooperation with Laurel Watkins, McKenzie published A Grammar of Kiowa in 1984. Some compared his work with the development of the Sequoyah and Cherokee alphabets. He also translated many texts from English, including Baptist hymns.

== Legacy ==
His contributions to the Kiowa were honored by the University of Colorado in 1991 with the awarding of an honorary doctorate, and his 100th birthday was honored with a ceremony in the Red Buffalo Hall of the Kiowa Tribal Complex in Carnegie, Oklahoma. McKenzie was a Freemason.

== Death ==
McKenzie died in 1999 at the age of 101 years, and was interred at Anadarko, Oklahoma. After his death, he was elected to the Oklahoma Historians Hall of Fame.

== Family ==
McKenzie and his wife, Nettie, had five children: two daughters and three sons.
