= Cherokee National Capitol =

- U.S. National Register of Historic Places
- U.S. National Historic Landmark
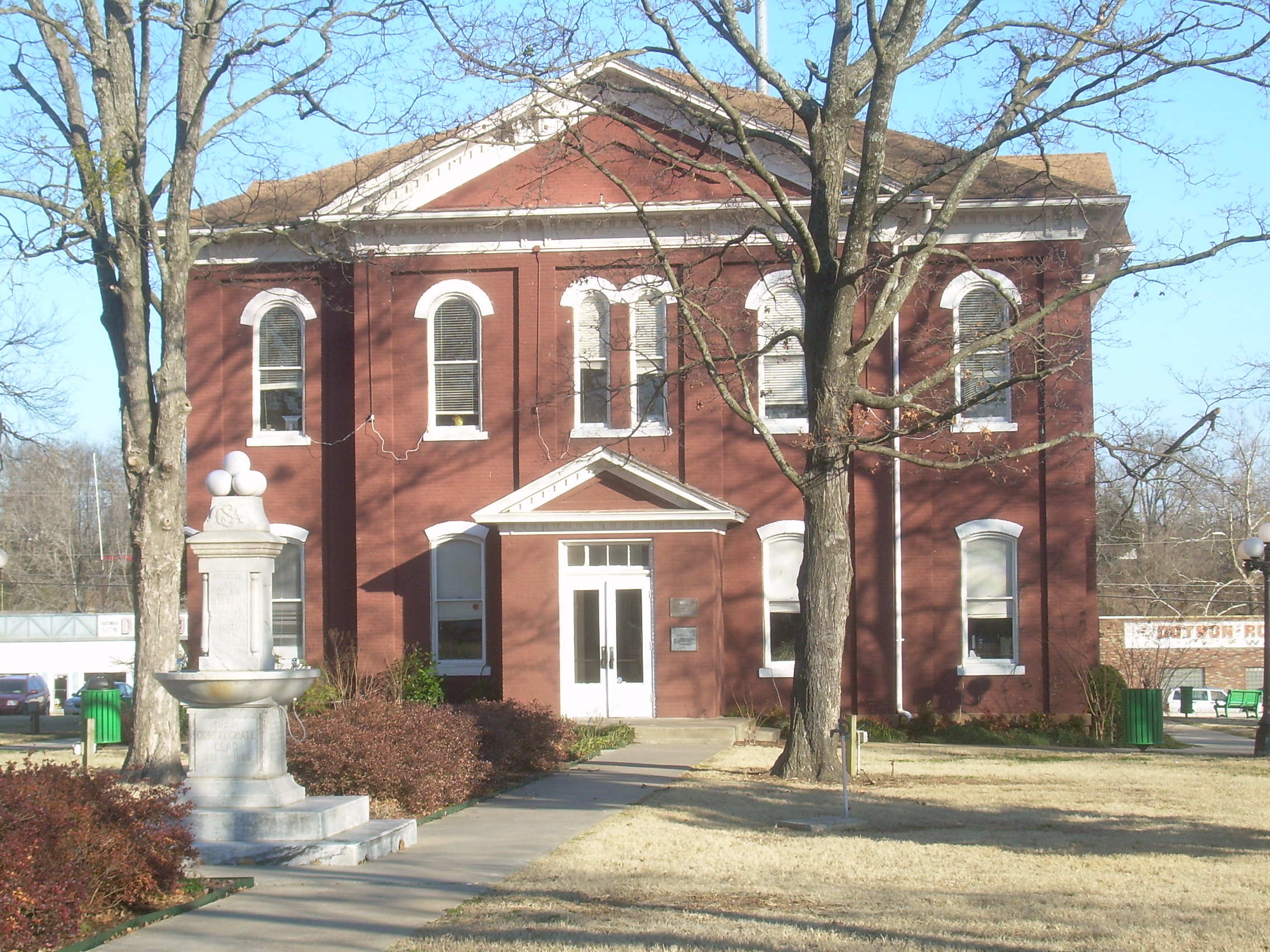
- Cherokee National Capitol

- Location within Oklahoma Location within the United States
- Location: 101 South Muskogee Avenue, Tahlequah, Oklahoma
- Coordinates: 35°54′45.38″N 94°58′13.95″W
- Built: 1867
- Architect: C.W. Goodlander
- Architectural style: Italianate
- NRHP reference No.: 66000627

Significant dates
- Added to NRHP: October 15, 1966
- Designated NHL: July 4, 1961

The Cherokee National Capitol (Cherokee: ᏣᎳᎩ ᎠᏰᎵ ᏧᏂᎳᏫᎢᏍᏗ ᎠᏓᏁᎸ), now the Cherokee National History Museum, is a historic tribal government building in Tahlequah, Oklahoma. Completed in 1869, it served as the capitol building of the Cherokee Nation from 1869 to 1907, when Oklahoma became a state. It now serves as the site of the tribal supreme court and judicial branch. It was designated a National Historic Landmark in 1961 for its role in the Nation's history.

== History ==
The Cherokee Nation first established a republican form of government in 1820, while still occupying their ancestral lands in the southeastern United States. The tribe was one of several forcibly relocated to what is now Oklahoma during the Trail of Tears of the 1830s. The Nation reestablished its government quickly, in 1838, following the removal, with Tahlequah as its capital. In addition to establishing its courts and council, the Nation built seminaries for both male and female students, as education was highly valued.

Early government meetings of the Nation were held out in the open, with later meetings in log structures. A courthouse was built in the 1840s, but most of the city's public buildings were destroyed during the American Civil War. This building was constructed from 1867 to 1869, after peace had been restored to the region. The building's style, a late interpretation of the Italianate, is unusual for Oklahoma. The architect was C. W. Goodlander. Originally it housed the nation's court as well as other offices, and was used for tribal council meetings. It served the tribal government until 1907, when the state of Oklahoma was established and the tribal government was abolished by an act of the United States Congress.

The capitol was designated a National Historic Landmark in 1961. The building currently houses the judicial branch of the Cherokee Nation government. In 2013, the nation began a restoration project to preserve the building's original appearance, including roof repairs with historical-era shingles, new decking, new doors and windows, and adding a cupola to the roof. The project also includes adding a new back porch.

=== Museum ===
The building was re-opened as the Cherokee National History Museum, an art and cultural history museum, in 2019.

== Description ==
The Cherokee Nation Courthouse stands in the center of Courthouse Square, bounded by East Delaware Street, South Water Avenue, East Keetoowah Street, and South Muskogee Avenue. It is a two-story masonry building with neoclassical Italianate style, built out of red brick and white-painted wooden trim. It is five bays wide and seven deep, with slightly projecting sections consisting of the center three bays on each side. Each of these is topped by a pedimented gable with a dentillated cornice. The wall bays are articulated by piers, and have segmented-arch windows on the ground floor and rounded-arch windows on the second. There are entrances on the east and west ends, the main entrance on the west side sheltered by a 20th-century brick vestibule.

== See also ==
- List of National Historic Landmarks in Oklahoma
- Oldest buildings in Oklahoma
- National Register of Historic Places listings in Cherokee County, Oklahoma
