= Richard Throssel =

Cree photographer (1882-1933)

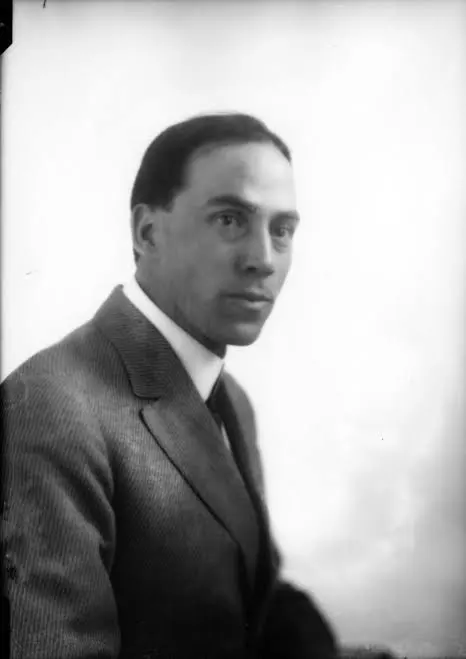
Richard Throssel, Self-Portrait, n.d.

Richard Throssell (1882–1933), known professionally under the surname Throssel, was a Cree and Métis photographer, who was formally adopted by the Crow and documented life on the Crow Reservation in the early 20th century. Throssell also served two terms in the Montana State Legislature, where he advocated for progressive social reforms and federally funded services for Indigenous communities.

== Biography ==
Richard Albert Throssell was born in Marengo, Washington on September 18, 1882, to Thomas Sr. and Mary Letitia (née Burston). Thomas was an English immigrant, while Mary, her grandparents, and her extended family were of Cree and Scottish descent. Records show that Throssell’s maternal great-grandfather, John Tate, migrated from the Scottish Orkney Islands to the Red River Settlement near Winnipeg, Manitoba, around 1790 as an employee of the Hudson's Bay Company. In 1841, the Tates and twenty-two other Red River Métis families relocated to the Oregon Territory, where Throssell was born.

Throssell and his six siblings grew up in a small farming community near the Puget Sound in an era of government-mandated assimilationist policies. His older brothers, Harry and Thomas Jr., attended Indian boarding schools, while Throssell attended public school. As a young man, Throssell suffered from debilitating rheumatism, which led him to drop out of school and seek a drier climate for treatment. In 1902, he moved in with his brother Harry to the Crow Reservation, where both worked as clerks for the Indian Service. Then, in 1904, Throssell married Florence Pifer, a white woman and laundress at the Crow Boarding School, who helped him learn the Crow language. The couple had two daughters, Vera (b. 1905) and Alberta (b. 1907).

Displaced from the Manitoba Métis community, Throssell lacked tribal citizenship and identified himself as French Canadian and Cree. In August 1906, the Crow ceremonially adopted Throssell and Vera, whose Indian status was formalized in April 1908. The adoptions entitled the family to a combined 500 acres of land on the Little Horn River near Wyola, Montana. In 1916, the Department of the Interior deemed Throssell “competent” for naturalization and forced him to become a U.S. citizen. The resulting tax burden pressured Throssell to sell his land to white settlers just two years later. Throssell and his family eventually moved to Billings, Montana, where he established the Throssel Photocraft Company.

Later in life, Throssell pursued painting, film, creative writing, and magazine publishing. He also joined the Montana National Guard. Throssell died on June 10, 1933, at the age of 51 from a heart attack. He was buried with full military honors near his home in Billings. His tombstone was paid for by his army compatriots, and the spelling of his name was taken from his professional name.

== Career ==
On the Crow Reservation, Throssell became an assistant clerk for the Indian Service, whose offices were across the street from nationally renowned artist Joseph Henry Sharp’s studio. Throssell, who had previously taken art classes at the Vashon Military Academy in Puget Sound, resumed his training with Sharp, who taught him painting, design, and photography. Throssell soon after purchased his own camera and began photographing his community in earnest.

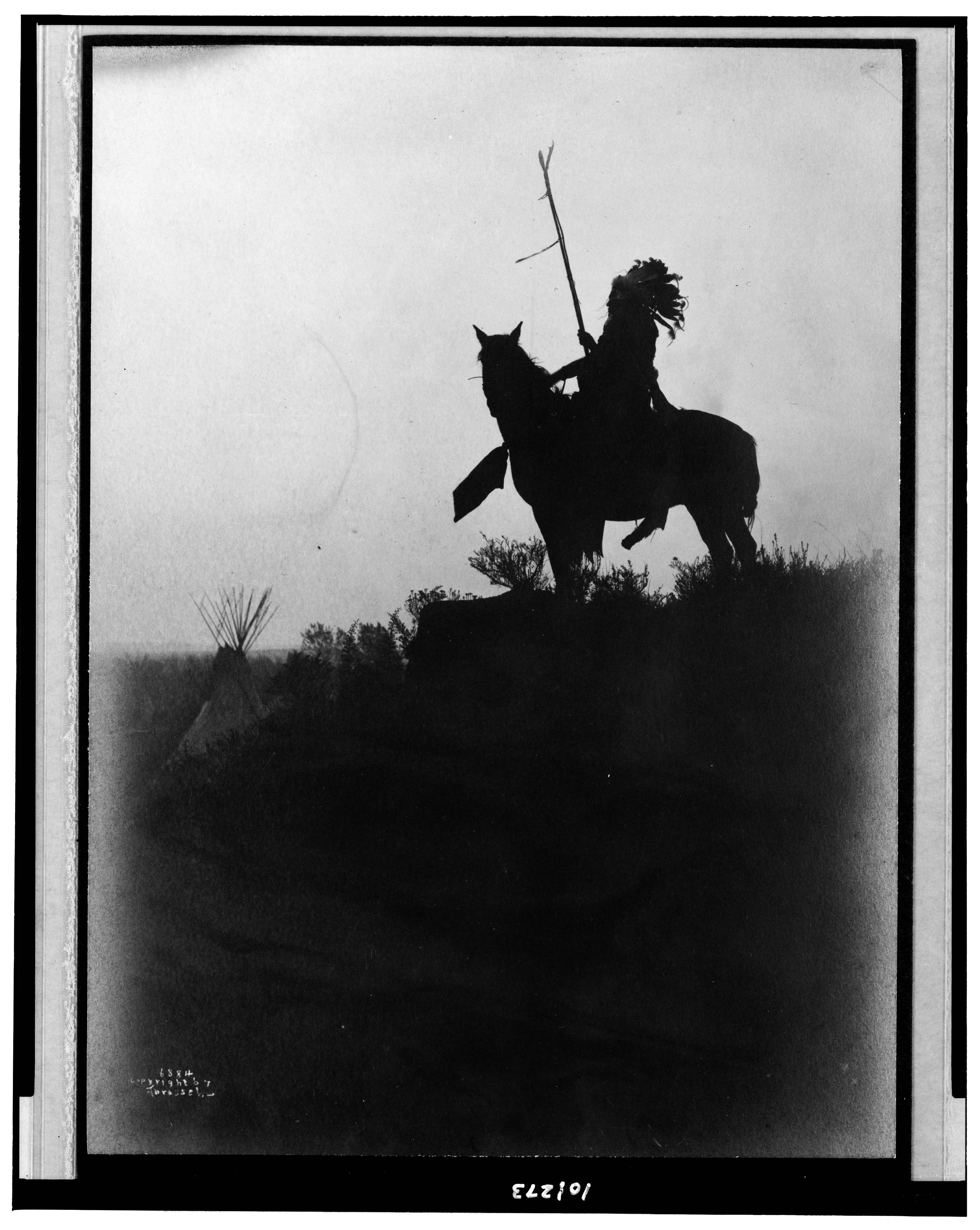
Throssel, The Sentinel, 1907

Throssell submitted his first photographs for copyright in 1905. That same year, Throssell met photographer Edward S. Curtis, who visited the Crow Reservation for his twenty-volume series, The North American Indian. Throssell briefly studied under Curtis, from whom Throssell learned popular technical and artistic strategies for representing Indigenous subjects. Curtis was known for his romanticized images of the “Vanishing Indian,” and his sentimental influence is evident in the photographs Throssel copyrighted in 1907. Extent records suggest that Throssell was never a formal student or employee of Curtis, but Curtis copyrighted Throssel’s “The Animal Dance” (1909) under his own name. Curtis did credit Throssel for his textual description of the ceremony.

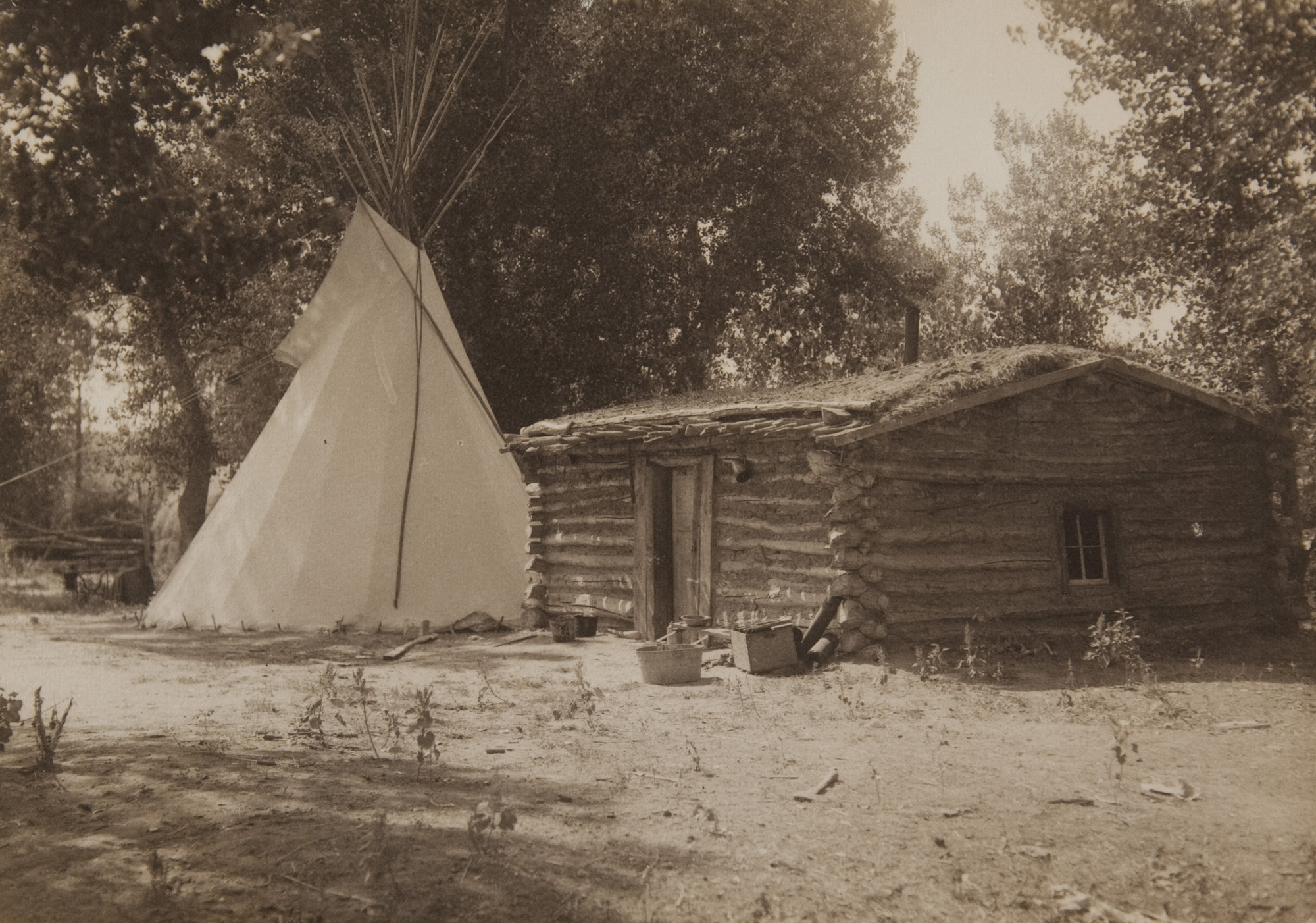
Throssel, The Old and New, c. 1910

Throssell continued to photograph Crow subjects for the inventor Joseph Dixon and the Wanamaker Expedition of 1908. Then, in 1909, Throssell was hired by the Indian Service as a full-time photographer assigned to document Crow daily life. This position offered Throssell national recognition and professional autonomy for the first time in his career. When the Office of Indian Affairs assigned Dr. Ferdinand Shoemaker to Montana in 1910, he hired Throssell to create instructional slides and films for Indigenous communities, who experienced high rates of tuberculosis and trachoma. The images advised Indigenous communities on public health and sanitation practices, which generally discouraged traditional living arrangements and ways of life. Throssel created over 1,300 lantern slides and 12 films, which toured nationally and reached nearly nine thousand Native Americans in California and Arizona alone. He quit the position in February 1911 due to unfair working conditions, citing Shoemaker as an “inconsiderate supervisor.”

After resigning from the Indian Service, Throssell moved to Billings, Montana, to open his own commercial photography business, the Throssel Photocraft Company. At this time, Throssell broadly advertised his “Western Classics” series, for which he is best known today. This collection of 49 romantic, pictorial images was marketed for settler audiences and available in different sizes and colors, as well as by mail order. He maintained the Throssel Photocraft Company until 1923 before working at Eklund Studio and, later, the Billings Gazette.

In less than a decade, Throssell built a personal collection of nearly 1,000 photographs, including “180 portraits of Crow people, 186 tipi scenes, 352 images of daily life and public events, and 39 ‘Western Classics.’” Throssell’s family donated his photographs and papers to the American Heritage Center, University of Wyoming, in 1967.

== Political Activism ==
After becoming a U.S. citizen in 1916, Throssell began publicly advocating for Indigenous rights. In 1917, Throssell sent letters to the Senate Committee on Indian Affairs, the Secretary of the Interior, and the Commissioner of Indian Affairs to protest the proposed sale of Crow lands. He also started a letter-writing campaign opposing the appropriation of Crow natural resources by the Big Horn Canyon Power and Irrigation Company. Throssell sent photographs and newspaper clippings as corroborating evidence. He also published a series of press releases, such as “Crow Indian Tells Redman’s Side,” in the local Billings Gazette.

In 1924, Throssell successfully ran for the Montana State Legislature, where he represented Yellowstone County for two terms. In 1927, he became chairman of the Committee on New Counties and Divisions and vice chairman for the Ways and Means and Fish and Game Committees. That same year, Throssell successfully championed H.B. 234, which granted the State Board of Health, Department of Education, and Department of Child and Animal Protection the right “to use federal funds to serve Montana’s Indians.” The bill included provisions for new schools and hospitals, infectious disease prevention, and geriatric care for Indigenous communities.
