= John Martin (judge) =

Judge of the Cherokee Tribal Court (1784-1840)

- Born: John Martin Jr. 1784; Coyatee, Cherokee Nation East
- Died: October 17, 1840 (aged 55–56); Indian Territory
- Occupations: Planter, judge
- Years active: 1822–1840
- Known for: Chief Justice, Supreme Court of the Cherokee Nation

John Martin (1784 – October 17, 1840) was a notable judge of the Cherokee Tribal Court. He was a highly educated member of the tribe, although he was only one-eighth Cherokee. A biographer describes him as blond, blue-eyed and a person who could easily pass for white. He had no formal training in law, but he was one of the first men appointed to serve as a judge on the Cherokee Tribal Court, which was established in 1822. After his term as judge ended in 1828, he was addressed as Judge Martin for the rest of his life. He also served the Cherokee Nation as Treasurer, He was also a member of the Cherokee Constitutional Convention that led to the formation of a real national government. In 1837, he removed from Georgia to Indian Territory, where he was elected as the first Chief Justice of the newly created Cherokee Supreme Court in 1839. He served until his death the following year.

== Ancestry and early life ==
John's mother was Susannah Emory, a one-quarter Cherokee who had been raised among the tribe. Susannah's grandfather was Ludovic Grant, a Scottish trader. Grant had married a full-blooded Cherokee woman. The Grants had a daughter who married William Emory and bore Susannah. Susannah was raised in the Cherokee culture. Her first husband was Captain John Stuart, an officer in the colonial army during the French-Indian War and an Indian agent during the American Revolution. (Note: Stuart and Susannah had one son, who was called "Bushyhead", because he had inherited his father's bushy blond hair. Bushyhead became the surname of his descendants, and many were important people among the Cherokees.) Susannah married again to Richard Fields, a mixed blood Cherokee, with whom she had seven children. Therefore, the marriage to John Martin Sr. was her third. John Martin Sr. and Susannah had three children: John Martin Jr., Nancy, and Rachael. John Sr., was a trader who had previously served as a captain in the American Revolution.

His father was John (Jack) Martin, Senior, a white man who was reportedly the brother of General Joseph Martin. It is unclear where the future judge was born. Some accounts claim he was born in what is now Tennessee, while others claim he was born in the present state of Georgia. (Note: Maddox says John Jr. was born near Coyatee, in Tennessee, and that his early life was spent in what is now Habersham County, Georgia. Fields asserts that young John grew up in the Tugaloo area along the present border between Georgia and South Carolina, where his parental family had moved about 1789.) Jack Martin evidently became a prosperous trader. Rather than sending his son away to school at an early age, he hired a tutor to educate his son at home. Jack Martin died about 1800 or 1801. His widow died while John Jr. was a teenager. Then, he went to live with a sister named Nancy and her husband, Jeter Lynch. At some point, young John went away to school in order to complete his formal education.

== Life in Georgia ==
Young John inherited a fortune from his father. He established a home along Sautee Creek, in present-day White County, Georgia, before 1818. He was appointed as a member of the Cherokee delegation to Washington, D. C. in that year, and was a signer of the Calhoun Treaty on February 27, 1819, which ceded the land where his Sautee plantation was located to the United States. The treaty allowed him to continue to live there on a 640 acres (260 ha) reservation, which he initially planned to do. However, by early 1822, he gave up his reservation and moved his family inside the new Cherokee boundary. (Note: The move may have occurred as early as 1820.) The new home was near the Coosawattee River, in what is now Murray County, Georgia.

The U.S. Congress passed and the president signed the Indian Removal Act in May 1830. The Act specified the removal of the Five Civilized Tribes from lands east of the Mississippi River. Within three days after passage, the state of Georgia proclaimed its authority over 4,600,000 acres (1,900,000 ha) of Cherokee land inside the Georgia borders. Surveyors quickly arrived to divide the land into 160 acres (65 ha) lots that would be given to non-Indians by lottery. The Georgia Guard, the state militia, entered the former Cherokee territory early in 1831, ostensibly to keep intruders out of the area. In reality, the Guard began harassing the inhabitants to encourage them to leave the state on their own. Guard members even came to Martin's home one night in February, 1831 and arrested him, saying only that he was "under suspicion."

The first Cherokee Land Lottery was held October 22, 1832, and included Martin's plantations (Coosawatie and one on Salequoyah (Salacoa) Creek. (Note: The Salacoa Valley is between Fairmount, Georgia, and Bartow County, Georgia. The name Salacoa is from the Cherokee language and can be translated into English as "greasy corn". The name also appears as "Salequoyah.") Coosawattee, where Martin lived with wife Nellie McDaniel, was the larger plantation, with 28 buildings and 300 acres (120 ha) under cultivation, plus apple and peach orchards. It was also the site of the toll gate that Martin operated on the Federal Road. Salequoyah, where he lived with his other wife, Nellie's sister Lucy McDaniel, had 11 buildings and 110 acres (45 ha) under cultivation. Although the law said that lottery winners could not take possession of their new properties until the Cherokee inhabitants had moved out, this restriction was largely ignored. The new owners simply moved in and, abetted by the Georgia Guard, forced out the previous occupants. Thus the Martin family was forced out of the Salequoyah (Salacoa) house and farm in 1833 or 1834. Fields wrote that records about exactly when and how the Martins were forced from Salequoyah have not been located. The right to Coosawattie plantation had been bought by a wealthy Georgian, Farish Carter, from the lottery winner. When Carter requested Martin to vacate the property in January, 1835, Georgia Governor Wilson Lumpkin intervened on Martin's behalf. Lumpkin wrote to Martin that Carter had agreed that Martin could remain there until the end of that year, "provided that he use his influence to bring our Indian affairs to a final issue, by the removal of the Cherokees." However, the Martins vacated the plantation in February 1835, and moved to a house in present-day Bradley County, Tennessee, a few miles above the Georgia state line. This house, which was located near the final eastern home of Chief John Ross, is still in existence, but was moved a short distance from its original location in the 1950s.

By 1835, two of Martin's sons-in-law had joined the political group known as the Treaty Party, which was led by John Ridge. Both signed the Treaty of New Echota and were committed to moving west. (Note: John Adair Bell and George Washington Adair were the Martin family members who signed. Bell became a noted leader of the tribe after resettlement.) The signing of the treaty split the tribe politically between the Treaty Party and Chief John Ross' National Party. Martin had tried to remain neutral and continue his work as a tribal leader, but he came to believe that Ross' efforts were doomed to failure. The move to Red Hill proved only a temporary respite. The last straw of harassment came when U. S. soldiers under General John E. Wool surrounded his house one night while he was meeting with several other members of the Cherokee Grand Council, arrested them and confiscated all the account books and other official documents in their possession In March 1837, Judge Martin and one of his sons-in-law led a group of three hundred Cherokee families on an overland trek to the West.

== Emigration to Indian Territory ==
Martin's experiences in losing his Georgia homes (and seeing his friends and relatives lose theirs) persuaded him that the Cherokees could not remain east of the Mississippi River. Many had already moved to Arkansas Territory, and were now known as the Western Cherokees. Initially, he had believed that his white skin, blond hair, blue eyes and fluency in English would save his family from the abuses directed at his people. He was wrong. While the Cherokee land was simply confiscated, the U.S. had agreed to pay for improvements the former residents had made. Thus, Judge Martin received $22,400 total compensation for the three plantations in Georgia. (Note: The two-story main house at Coosawatie was valued at $4,000.) He was compensated $2,500 in 1837 for his land, house and several outbuildings in Tennessee. A few months later in the same year, the U.S. government sold the Tennessee property, plus the 689 acres (279 ha) of land to settler George Hambright and his wife for $12,500. (Note: This house still stands about 5 miles (8.0 km) south of Cleveland in Bradley County, Tennessee, at 5640 Dalton Pike, S. E. It is a private residence.)

The Martins established a new home on the Saline River in Indian Territory, near the present town of Locust Grove, Oklahoma. The Eastern and Western Cherokees reconciled and formed a unified government with a new constitution. Judge Martin was elected as the first Chief Justice of the reconstituted Cherokee Supreme Court in Indian Territory. He served his nation in this capacity until his death from "Brain fever" on October 17, 1840, in Fort Gibson.

== Service in the Cherokee Judiciary ==
The Cherokee Nation created its judicial system by a law on October 20, 1820. The system had eight districts, each of which had eight district judges and four circuit judges. John Martin was appointed a Circuit Judge for the Coosawattee and Amohee Districts, beginning with the 1822 term. In November 1822, he was also selected as one of the District Judges appointed to the newly formed Superior Court, which was charged with handling all cases that might be appealed from the District Courts. This court referred to itself as the Supreme Court of the Cherokee Nation. The first justices of this court were: John Martin, James Daniel, Richard Walker and James Brown. None of these had any formal legal training.

After the expiration of his term on the Cherokee Supreme Court in 1828, Martin was asked to serve as Treasurer of the Cherokee Nation. He was responsible for receiving and disbursing funds paid to the tribe by the U.S. Government, collecting debts owed to the nation by individuals, leasing turnpikes and ferries within the Cherokee Nation's boundaries, He continued to serve as Treasurer until he and his family emigrated to Indian Territory in 1837.

== Personal ==
John Martin Jr., who had never accepted baptism into the Christian religion, practiced polygamy. He met and married two sisters, Nellie and Lucy McDaniel, daughters of Alexander McDaniel, and reportedly had eight children with each of the women. He had one house in Coosawattie where he lived with Nellie and another house in the Salacoa Valley, where he lived with Lucy. According to Fields, one descendant said the marriages were in 1807 and 1810. Fields speculates that Martin may have married both at the same time, a common practice among polygamous Cherokees.

His obituary in the Arkansas Gazette said that Judge Martin died of "brain fever" on October 17, 1840, near Fort Gibson in Indian Territory. He was buried at the fort, where his tombstone describes him as "the chief justice of the supreme court of the Cherokee Nation."

== See also ==
- List of Native American jurists
