= Kiowa language =

North American aboriginal language

Kiowa
- G̶áuid̶òᵰgyà ~ [Gáui[dòñ:gyà
- Native to: United States
- Region: western Oklahoma
- Ethnicity: Kiowa people
- Native speakers: 20 (2007)
- Language family: Tanoan: Kiowa
- Signed forms: Hand Talk

Language codes
- ISO 639-3: kio
- Glottolog: kiow1266
- ELP: Kiowa
- Linguasphere: 64-CBB-a
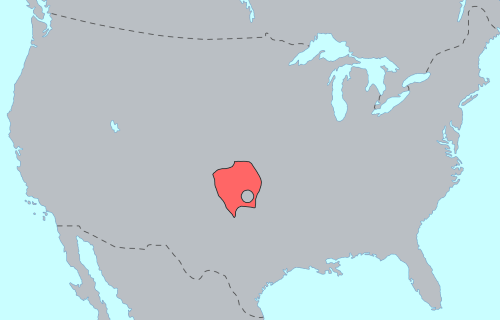
- Distribution of the Kiowa language after migration to the Southern Plains

- Kiowa is classified as Severely Endangered by the UNESCO Atlas of the World's Languages in Danger.

- Person: g̶áuikʼì / [gáuikʼì (m), g̶áuimà: / [gáuimà: (f)
- People: g̶áuigú / [gáuigú
- Language: g̶áuid̶òᵰ:gyà / [gáui[dòñ:gyà
- Country: G̶áuidàumgya / [Gáuidàumgya

Kiowa (English: /ˈkaɪ.oʊ.wə/ KY-oh-wə), in the language itself G̶áuid̶òᵰ:gyà (also rendered [Gáui[dòñ:gyà, 'language of the Kiowa'), is a Tanoan language spoken by the Kiowa people, primarily in Caddo, Kiowa, and Comanche counties, Oklahoma. The Kiowa tribal center is located in Carnegie. Like most North American indigenous languages, Kiowa is an endangered language.

== Origins ==
Although Kiowa is most closely related to the other Tanoan languages of the Pueblos, the earliest historic location of its speakers is western Montana around 1700. Prior to the historic record, oral histories, archaeology, and linguistics suggest that pre-Kiowa was the northernmost dialect of Proto-Kiowa-Tanoan, spoken at Late Basketmaker II Era sites. Around AD 450, they migrated northward through the territory of the Ancestral Puebloans and Great Basin, occupying the eastern Fremont culture region of the Colorado Plateau until sometime before 1300. Speakers then drifted northward to the northwestern Plains, arriving no later than the mid-16th century in the Yellowstone area where the Kiowa were first encountered by Europeans. The Kiowa then later migrated to the Black Hills and the southern Plains, where the language was recorded in historic times.

== Demographics ==
Colorado College anthropologist Laurel Watkins noted in 1984 based on Parker McKenzie's estimates that only about 400 people (mostly over the age of 50) could speak Kiowa and that only rarely were children learning the language. A more recent figure from McKenzie is 300 adult speakers of "varying degrees of fluency" reported by Mithun (1999) out of a 12,242 Kiowa tribal membership (US Census 2000).

The Intertribal Wordpath Society, a nonprofit group dedicated to preserving native languages of Oklahoma, estimates the maximum number of fluent Kiowa speakers as of 2006 to be 400. A 2013 newspaper article estimated 100 fluent speakers. UNESCO classifies Kiowa as 'severely endangered.' It claims the language had only 20 mother-tongue speakers in 2007, along with 80 second language speakers, most of whom were between the ages of 45 and 60.

== Revitalization efforts ==
The University of Tulsa, the University of Oklahoma in Norman, and the University of Science and Arts of Oklahoma in Chickasha offer Kiowa language classes.

Kiowa hymns are sung at Mount Scott Kiowa United Methodist Church.

Starting in the 2010s, the Kiowa Tribe offered weekly language classes at the Jacobson House, a nonprofit Native American art center in Norman, Oklahoma. Dane Poolaw and Carol Williams taught the language using Parker McKenzie's method.

Alecia Gonzales (Kiowa/Apache, 1926–2011), who taught at USAO, wrote a Kiowa teaching grammar called Thaum khoiye tdoen gyah: beginning Kiowa language. Modina Toppah Water (Kiowa) edited Saynday Kiowa Indian Children’s Stories, a Kiowa language book of trickster stories published in 2013.

In 2022, Tulsa Public Schools signed an agreement with the Kiowa Tribe of Oklahoma to teach Kiowa language and culture in the district. As of 2024, the Kiowa Tribe has a Kiowa Language Department.

== Phonology ==
There are 23 consonants:

		Labial	Dental	Alveolar	Palatal	Velar	Glottal
Nasal		m	n				
Plosive/ Affricate	voiceless	p	t	t͜s		k	ʔ
Plosive/ Affricate	voiced	b	d			ɡ	
Plosive/ Affricate	aspirated	pʰ	tʰ			kʰ	
Plosive/ Affricate	ejective	pʼ	tʼ	t͜sʼ		kʼ	
Fricative	voiceless			s			h
Fricative	voiced			z			
Approximant		(w)	l		j		

Kiowa distinguishes six vowel qualities, with three distinctive levels of height and a front-back contrast. All six vowels may be long or short, oral or nasal. Four of the vowels occur as diphthongs with a high front off-glide of the form vowel + /j/.

There are 24 vowels:

Monophthongs
		Front		Back	
		short	long	short	long
Close	oral	i	iː	u	uː
Close	nasal	ĩ	ĩː	ũ	ũː
Mid	oral	e	eː	o	oː
Mid	nasal	ẽ	ẽː	õ	õː
Open	oral	a	aː	ɔ	ɔː
Open	nasal	ã	ãː	ɔ̃	ɔ̃ː

Diphthongs
	Front	Back
High		uj
Mid		oj
Low	aj	ɔj

Contrasts among the consonants are easily demonstrated with an abundance of minimal and near-minimal pairs. There is no contrast between the presence of an initial glottal stop and its absence.

IPA	Example	Meaning
/pʼ/	/pʼí/	'female's sister'
/pʰ/	/pʰí/	'fire; hill; heavy'
/p/	/pĩ/	'food eating'
/b/	/bĩ/	'foggy'
/tʼ/	/tʼáp/	'deer'
/tʰ/	/tʰáp/	'dry'
/t/	/tá/	'eye'

The ejective and aspirated stops are articulated forcefully. The unaspirated voiceless stops are tense, while the voiced stops are lax.

The voiceless alveolar fricative /s/ is pronounced [ʃ] before /j/

Orthography	Pronunciation	Meaning
sét	[sét]	'bear'
syân	[ʃẽnˀ]	'be small'
sân	[sânˀ]	'child'

The lateral /l/ is realized as [l] in syllable-initial position, as lightly affricated [ɫ] in syllable-final position, and slightly devoiced in utterance-final position. It occurs seldom in word-initial position.

célê	[séːʲlêʲ]	'set'
gúldɔ	[ɡúɫdɔ]	'be red, painted'
sál	[sáɫ]	'be hot'

The dental resonants /l/ and /n/ are palatalized before /i/.

tʰàlí	[tʰàlʲí]	'boy'
bõnî	[bõʷnʲî]	'see'

All consonants may begin a syllable but /l/ may not occur word-initially outside of loan-words (/la.yãn/ 'lion'). The only consonants which may terminate a syllable are /p, t, m, n, l, j/.

Certain sequences of consonant and vowel do not occur: dental and alveolar obstruents preceding /i/ (*tʼi, tʰi, ti, di, si, zi); velars and /j/ preceding /e/ (*kʼe, kʰe, ke, ɡe, je). These sequences do occur if they are the result of contraction: /hègɔ èm hâ/ [hègèm hâ] 'then he got up'

The glide /j/ automatically occurs between all velars and /a/, except if they are together as the result of a conjunction (/hègɔ á bõ:/ [hègá bõ:] 'then he saw them'), or in loanwords ([kánò] 'American' >Sp. Americano).

Nasalization of voiced stops operates automatically only within the domain of the pronominal prefixes: voiced stops become the corresponding nasals either preceding or following a nasal. The velar nasal that is derived from /ɡ/ is deleted; there is no /ŋ/ in Kiowa.

Underlying //ia// surfaces in alternating forms as /ja/ following velars, as /a/ following labials and as /iː/ if accompanied by falling tone.

Obstruents are devoiced in two environments: in syllable-final position and following a voiceless obstruent. Voiced stops are devoiced in syllable-final position without exception. In effect, the rule applies only to /b/ and /d/ since velars are prohibited in final position.

The palatal glide /j/ spreads across the laryngeals /h/ and /ʔ/, yielding a glide onset, a brief moment of coarticulation and a glide release. The laryngeals /h/ and /ʔ/ are variably deleted between sonorants, which also applies across a word boundary.

== Orthography ==
Kiowa has been written in several writing systems based on the Latin alphabet. One Kiowa alphabet was developed by native speaker Parker McKenzie, who had worked with J. P. Harrington and later with other linguists. The development of the orthography is detailed in Meadows & McKenzie (2001). However, McKenzie's use of letters such as ⟨f⟩, ⟨v⟩, ⟨j⟩, ⟨x⟩ to represent consonant sounds different from their English values was not universally adopted. Another system was developed by an SIL field school. The most recent system, developed by Dane Poolaw, reduced the number of diacritics in the 2010s. The current alphabet uses the barred letters B̶ b̶, D̶ d̶, G̶ g̶ and n̶. However, there are problems with Unicode support. The combining diacritic used here, U+0336 ̶ COMBINING LONG STROKE OVERLAY, does not display properly in many fonts. Unicode considers these letters to be allographs of the stem-struck letters Ƀ ƀ, Đ đ, Ǥ ǥ, and says that the difference should be handled by a custom font. A few fonts, such as Gentium and Andika, do use character variants to handle the difference, but more commonly a hack is used, where these letters are substituted by their basic-Latin equivalents preceded by a square bracket: [B [b, [D [d, [G [g, plus ñ for n̶. Unicode 18.0 published in September 2026 added support for lowercase n̶ and its uppercase as single characters: U+1DF4D 𝽍 LATIN CAPITAL LETTER BARRED N and U+1DF4E 𝽎 LATIN SMALL LETTER BARRED N.

The alphabetical order is monophthong followed by diphthong; these are intercalated among the consonants as in the English alphabet. Vowel length and tone are ignored, except when two words are otherwise spelled the same. The nasalization mark comes after the vowel but is alphabetized as a separate letter, e.g. ⟨auiñ⟩ for /ɔ̃i̯/ comes between auin and auio.

=== Vowels ===
Vowels
Orthography	Pronunciation	Orthography	Pronunciation
au	ɔ	aui	ɔj
a	a	ai	aj
e	e		
i	i		
o	o	oi	oj
u	u (in ⟨g̶u, gu, kʼu, ku⟩)	ui	uj

The mid-back vowel /ɔ/ is indicated by a digraph ⟨au⟩. The four diphthongs indicate the offglide /j/ with the letter ⟨i⟩ following the main vowel. In the earlier orthography, nasal vowels were indicated with a macron under the vowel letter, and a long vowel with a macron above, thus ⟨ō̱⟩ for a long nasal vowel. In the current orthography, these are indicated with a barred n and a colon, thus the same long nasal vowel is now ⟨on̶:⟩. (The letter n̶ may be substituted with ñ or ᵰ when the Unicode 18.0 character 𝽎 is not available.) The length mark appears after the nasalization mark, e.g. ⟨auñ:⟩ for /ɔ̃ː/ and ⟨aiñ:⟩ for /ãːi̯/.

Tone is indicated with diacritics. The acute accent ⟨´⟩ represents high tone, the grave accent ⟨`⟩ indicates low tone, and the circumflex ⟨ˆ⟩ indicates falling tone, exemplified on the vowel o as ⟨ó⟩ (high), ⟨ò⟩ (low), ⟨ô⟩ (falling). The previous long nasal vowel with high tone is thus ⟨ṓ̱⟩ or ⟨ón̶:⟩.

=== Consonants ===
For the consonants, the letters ⟨b d g h l m n s w z⟩ represent the same sounds as in the IPA. The letter ⟨y⟩ represents the palatal glide /j/.

The letters ⟨p t k⟩ represent the aspirated stops /pʰ tʰ kʰ/, but only at the start of a syllable. At the end of a syllable, ⟨p t⟩ instead represent unaspirated preglottalized stops [ˀp ˀt], or may merge as a glottal stop [ʔ]. (The velar stop does not generally occur at the end of a syllable.) The spelling of the voiceless unaspirated plosives and affricates (plain and ejective) varies between different systems:

Consonants with alternative spellings
Sound	Spellings			
Sound	McKenzie	Poolaw 2023	Kiowa Language Department 2022	Other
/p/	f	b̶	[b	pb
/t/	j	d̶	[d	td
/k/	c	g̶	[g	kg
/t͜s/	ch	ts		
/pʼ/	v	pʼ		
/tʼ/	th	tʼ		
/kʼ/	q	kʼ		
/t͜sʼ/	x	tsʼ		

Velar plosive phonemes /ɡ, k, kʰ, kʼ/ are regularly palatalized [ɡʲ, kʲ, kʰʲ, kʼʲ] before the vowel phoneme /a/. This glide is written in Harrington's vocabulary, but is omitted in McKenzie's writing system (which instead uses the apostrophe ⟨’⟩ after the consonant letter to mark the rare cases, found in loanwords, where unpalatalized velars occur before /a/, e.g. c’átlìn). The glottal stop /ʔ/ is also not written as it is often deleted and its presence is predictable. A final convention is that pronominal prefixes are written as separate words instead of being attached to verbs.

== Morphology ==
=== Nouns ===
==== Number inflection ====
Kiowa, like other Tanoan languages, is characterized by an inverse number system. Kiowa has four noun classes. Class I nouns are inherently singular/dual, Class II nouns are inherently dual/plural, Class III nouns are inherently dual, and Class IV nouns are mass or noncount nouns. If the number of a noun is different from its class's inherent value, the noun takes the suffix -gau (or a variant).

class	singular	dual	plural
I	–	–	-gau
II	-gau	–	–
III	-gau	–	-gau
IV	—N/a	—N/a	—N/a

Mithun (1999:445) gives as an example chē̱̂ "horse/two horses" (Class I) made plural with the addition of -gau: chē̱̂gau "horses". On the other hand, the Class II noun tṓ̱sè "bones/two bones" is made singular by suffixing -gau: tṓ̱sègau "bone."

=== Verbs ===
Kiowa verbs consist of verb stems that can be preceded by prefixes, followed by suffixes, and incorporate other lexical stems into the verb complex. Kiowa verbs have a complex active–stative pronominal system expressed via prefixes, which can be followed by incorporated nouns, verbs, or adverbs. Following the main verb stem are suffixes that indicate tense/aspect and mode. A final group of suffixes that pertain to clausal relations can follow the tense-aspect-modal suffixes. These syntactic suffixes include relativizers, subordinating conjunctions, and switch-reference indicators. A skeletal representation of the Kiowa verb structure can be represented as the following:

pronominal prefix	-	incorporated elements (adverb + noun + verb)	-	VERB STEM	-	tense/aspect-modal suffixes	-	syntactic suffixes

The pronominal prefixes and tense/aspect-modal suffixes are inflectional and required to be present on every verb.

==== Pronominal inflection ====
Kiowa verb stems are inflected with prefixes that indicate:

1. grammatical person
2. grammatical number
3. semantic roles of animate participants

All these of the categories are indicated for only the primary animate participant. If there is also a second participant (such as in transitive sentences), the number of the second participant is also indicated. A participant is primary in the following cases:

- A volitional agent participant (i.e. the doer of the action who also has control over the action) is primary if it is the only participant in the clause.
- In two-participant volitional agent/non-agent clauses:
  1. The non-agent participant is primary when
    - the non-agent is not in the first person singular or third person singular AND
    - the volitional agent is singular
  2. The volitional agent participant is primary when
    - the non-agent is in the first person singular or third person singular AND
    - the volitional agent is non-singular

The term non-agent here refers to semantic roles including involitional agents, patients, beneficiaries, recipients, experiencers, and possessors.

Intransitive verbs
	Number		
Person	Singular	Dual	Plural
1st	à-		è-
2nd	èm-	mà-	bà-
3rd	–	è̱-	á-
Inverse	è-		

Agent transitive verbs
	Volitional Agent Primary Person-Number							
Non-agent Number	1st-Sg.	2nd-Sg.	2nd-Dual	2nd-Pl.	3rd-Sg.	3rd-Dual	3rd-Pl.	1st-Dual/Pl. 3rd-Inverse
Sg.	gà-	à-	má-`-	bá-`-	–	é̱-`-	á-`-	é-`-
Dual	nèn-	mèn-	mén-	bèj-	è̱-	én-	èj-	èj-
Pl.	gàj-	bàj-	mán-`-	báj-`-	gà-	én-`-	gá-`-	éj-`-
Inverse	dé-	bé-	mén-`-	béj-	é-	én-	è-	éj-

== Bibliography ==
- Adger, David and Daniel Harbour. (2005). The syntax and syncretisms of the person-case constraint. In K. Hiraiwa & J. Sabbagh (Eds.), MIT working papers in linguistics (No. 50).
- Campbell, Lyle (1997). American Indian languages: The historical linguistics of Native America. New York: Oxford University Press. ISBN 0-19-509427-1.
- Crowell, Edith (1949). "A preliminary report on Kiowa structure". International Journal of American Linguistics. 15 (3): 163–167. doi:10.1086/464040. S2CID 143640379.
- Gonzales, Alecia Keahbone (2001). Thaum khoiye tdoen gyah: Beginning Kiowa language. Chickasha, OK: University of Science and Arts of Oklahoma Foundation. ISBN 0-9713894-0-3.
- Hale, Kenneth (1962). "Jemez and Kiowa correspondences in reference to Kiowa–Tanoan". International Journal of American Linguistics. 28: 1–5. doi:10.1086/464664. S2CID 144694575.
- Harbour, Daniel (2003). "The Kiowa case for feature insertion". Natural Language & Linguistic Theory. 21 (3): 543–578. doi:10.1023/A:1024196621352. JSTOR 4048042.
- Harrington, John P. (1928). Vocabulary of the Kiowa language. Bureau of American Ethnology bulletin (No. 84). Washington, D.C.: U.S. Govt. Print. Off.
- Harrington, John P. (1947). "Three Kiowa texts". International Journal of American Linguistics. 12 (4): 237–242. doi:10.1086/463919. S2CID 144483038.
- Hickerson, Nancy P. (1985). "Some Kiowa terms for currency and financial transactions". International Journal of American Linguistics. 51 (4): 446–449. doi:10.1086/465926. S2CID 144081589.
- McKenzie, Andrew. (2012). The role of contextual restriction in reference-tracking. Ph.D. thesis, University of Massachusetts Amherst. http://scholarworks.umass.edu/dissertations/AAI3518260.
- McKenzie, Parker; & Harrington, John P. (1948). Popular account of the Kiowa Indian language. Santa Fe: University of New Mexico Press.
- Meadows, William C.; McKenzie, Parker P. (August 1, 2001). "The Parker P. McKenzie Kiowa orthography: How written Kiowa came into being". Plains Anthropologist. 46 (176): 233–248. doi:10.1080/2052546.2001.11932030. S2CID 164090335. Archived from the original on 2012-11-05 – via HighBeam Research.
- Merrill, William; Hansson, Marian; Greene, Candace; & Reuss, Frederick. (1997). A guide to the Kiowa collections at the Smithsonian Institution. Smithsonian Contributions to Anthropology 40.
- Merrifield, William R. (1959). "The Kiowa verb prefix". International Journal of American Linguistics. 25 (3): 168–176. doi:10.1086/464523. S2CID 144102437.
- Merrifield, William R. (1959). "Classification of Kiowa nouns". International Journal of American Linguistics. 25 (4): 269–271. doi:10.1086/464544. S2CID 144369971.
- Miller, Wick R. (1959). "A note on Kiowa linguistic affiliations". American Anthropologist. 61: 102–105. doi:10.1525/aa.1959.61.1.02a00130.
- Mithun, Marianne. (1999). The languages of Native North America. Cambridge: Cambridge University Press. ISBN 0-521-23228-7 (hbk); ISBN 0-521-29875-X.
- Palmer, Jr., Gus (Pánthâidè). (2004). Telling stories the Kiowa way.
- Sivertsen, Eva (1956). "Pitch problems in Kiowa". International Journal of American Linguistics. 22 (2): 117–30. doi:10.1086/464356. S2CID 144110239.
- Takahashi, Junichi. (1984). Case marking in Kiowa. CUNY. (Doctoral dissertation).
- Trager, George L.; Trager, Edith (1959). "Kiowa and Tanoan". American Anthropologist. 61 (6): 1078–1083. doi:10.1525/aa.1959.61.6.02a00140.
- Trager, Edith C. (1960). The Kiowa language: A grammatical study. University of Pennsylvania. (Doctoral dissertation, University of Pennsylvania).
- Trager-Johnson, Edith C. (1972). Kiowa and English pronouns: Contrastive morphosemantics. In L. M. Davis (Ed.), Studies in linguistics, in honor of Raven I. McDavid. University of Alabama Press.
- Watkins, Laurel J. (1976). Position in grammar: Sit, stand, and lie. In Kansas working papers in linguistics (Vol. 1). Lawrence.
- Watkins, Laurel J. (1990). "Noun phrase versus zero in Kiowa discourse". International Journal of American Linguistics. 56 (3): 410–426. doi:10.1086/466165. S2CID 145426325.
- Watkins, Laurel J. (1993). "The discourse functions of Kiowa switch-reference". International Journal of American Linguistics. 59 (2): 137–164. doi:10.1086/466193. S2CID 143325129.
- Watkins, Laurel J.; Harbour, Daniel (2010). "The Linguistic Genius Of Parker McKenzie's Kiowa Alphabet". International Journal of American Linguistics. 76 (3): 309–333. doi:10.1086/652791. JSTOR 10.1086/652791.
- Watkins, Laurel J.; & McKenzie, Parker. (1984). A grammar of Kiowa. Studies in the anthropology of North American Indians. Lincoln: University of Nebraska Press. ISBN 0-8032-4727-3.
- Wonderly, William; Gibson, Lornia; Kirk, Paul (1954). "Number in Kiowa: Nouns, demonstratives, and adjectives". International Journal of American Linguistics. 20: 1–7. doi:10.1086/464244. S2CID 144480683.
