= Park Hill, Oklahoma =

Unincorporated community in Oklahoma, US

Park Hill, Oklahoma ᎠᏭᏂᏴᏍᏗ (Cherokee)
- Census-designated place
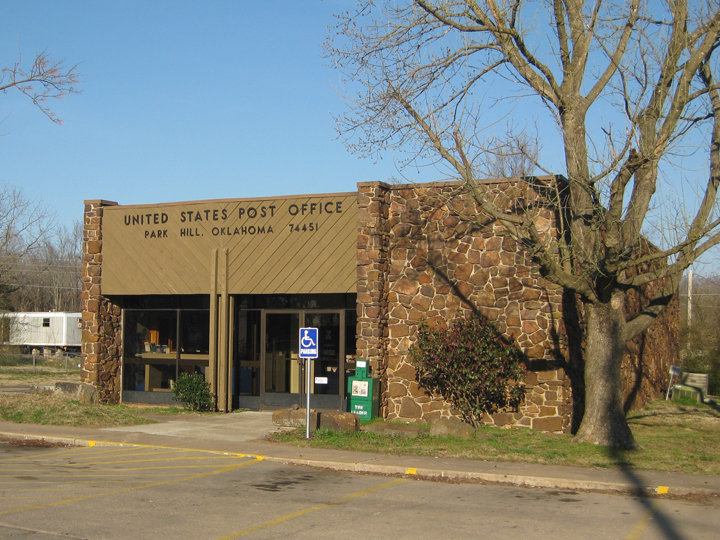
- Park Hill post office in March 18, 2010

- Location within Cherokee County and the state of Oklahoma
- Coordinates: 35°50′30″N 94°58′24″W
- Country: United States
- State: Oklahoma
- County: Cherokee

Area
  - Total: 25.16 sq mi (65.17 km^{2})
  - Land: 24.83 sq mi (64.32 km^{2})
  - Water: 0.33 sq mi (0.85 km^{2})
- Elevation: 761 ft (232 m)

Population (2020)
  - Total: 3,193
  - Density: 128.6/sq mi (49.65/km^{2})
- Time zone: UTC-6 (Central (CST))
  - Summer (DST): UTC-5 (CDT)
- ZIP code: 74451
- Area codes: 539/918
- FIPS code: 40-57300
- GNIS feature ID: 2409027

Park Hill (Cherokee: ᎠᏭᏂᏴᏍᏗ, romanized: Awuniyvsdi) is an unincorporated community and census-designated place (CDP) in southwestern Cherokee County, Oklahoma, United States. As of the 2020 census, Park Hill had a population of 3,193. It lies near Tahlequah, east of the junction of U.S. Route 62 and State Highway 82.

Founded in 1838, Park Hill became the home of many important Cherokee leaders, including John Ross after their removal from the southeastern U.S. It has been called "the center of Cherokee culture."

The W.W. Keeler Tribal Complex, the headquarters of the Cherokee Nation, is in Park Hill.

== History ==
Park Hill was a pre-established hamlet that became the home for many of the Cherokee after coming from the East on the "Trail of Tears". In 1829 the Park Hill Mission was established. The mission had one of the earliest presses in Oklahoma, the Park Hill Mission Press. The first post office was established at Park Hill on May 18, 1838. It was in Park Hill that Chief John Ross made his home in 1839, as well as his nephew-in-law George Murrell, whose home still stands. On May 6, 1847, the post office was moved to Tahlequah. The Cherokee Female Seminary was built here in 1849.

Park Hill was the center of culture for the Cherokees for many years, and as such in 1940 the National Society of the Colonial Dames of America in Oklahoma erected a marker at Park Hill declaring it the "Center of Cherokee culture".

The post office at Park Hill was re-established April 22, 1892.

In and around Park Hill are several important sites listed on the National Register of Historic Places, including the Murrell Home, the Park Hill Mission Cemetery (also known as the Worcester cemetery), the Ross Cemetery, and the original Cherokee Female Seminary. The Cherokee Heritage Center in Park Hill, was built on the former grounds of the Female Seminary. The Echota Ceremonial Ground has been located in Park Hill since 2001, on the north side of town.

Park Hill Mission, which antedated the community, was founded in 1829. The first person buried in Park Hill Mission Cemetery was Elias Boudinot, founder of the Cherokee Phoenix newspaper, who was assassinated in Park Hill on June 23, 1839. Samuel Worcester and his two wives were also interred here. The last burial in this cemetery was a Worcester daughter, Ann Eliza Worcester Robertson. in 1905. This cemetery was listed on the National Register of Historic Places on December 6, 2006.

== Geography ==
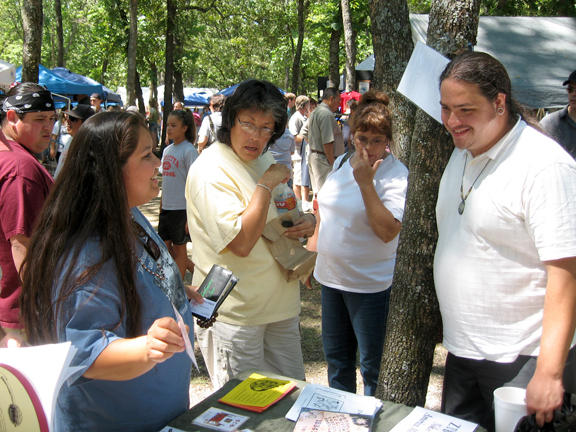
Arts and crafts booths at Cherokee National Holiday in Park Hill, 2007

Park Hill is located south of the center of Cherokee County and is bordered to the north by Tahlequah, the county seat. U.S. Route 62 leads north to Tahlequah and southwest 25 miles (40 km) to Muskogee, while Oklahoma State Highway 82 leads south 31 miles (50 km) to Vian.

According to the United States Census Bureau, the Park Hills CDP has a total area of 34.9 square miles (90.4 km^{2}), of which 34.4 square miles (89.1 km^{2}) is land and 0.50 square miles (1.3 km^{2}), or 1.48%, is water.

== Demographics ==
Historical population
Census	Pop.	Note	%±
2010	3,909		—
2020	3,193		−18.3%
U.S. Decennial Census

=== 2020 census ===
As of the 2020 census, Park Hill had a population of 3,193. The median age was 34.1 years. 29.2% of residents were under the age of 18 and 13.6% of residents were 65 years of age or older. For every 100 females there were 96.6 males, and for every 100 females age 18 and over there were 90.7 males age 18 and over.

40.2% of residents lived in urban areas, while 59.8% lived in rural areas.

There were 1,109 households in Park Hill, of which 39.2% had children under the age of 18 living in them. Of all households, 45.6% were married-couple households, 16.6% were households with a male householder and no spouse or partner present, and 29.8% were households with a female householder and no spouse or partner present. About 22.3% of all households were made up of individuals and 9.1% had someone living alone who was 65 years of age or older.

There were 1,287 housing units, of which 13.8% were vacant. The homeowner vacancy rate was 2.9% and the rental vacancy rate was 10.3%.

Racial composition as of the 2020 census
Race	Number	Percent
White	1,138	35.6%
Black or African American	70	2.2%
American Indian and Alaska Native	1,413	44.3%
Asian	2	0.1%
Native Hawaiian and Other Pacific Islander	1	0.0%
Some other race	99	3.1%
Two or more races	470	14.7%
Hispanic or Latino (of any race)	220	6.9%

=== 2010 census ===
As of the census of 2010, there were 3,909 people, 1,260 households, and 986 families residing in the CDP. The population density was 113.3 inhabitants per square mile (43.7/km^{2}). There were 1,437 housing units at an average density of 41.6 per square mile (16.1/km^{2}). The racial makeup of the CDP was 43.4% White, 1.3% African American, 40.3% Native American, 0.1% Asian, 4% from other races, and 10.8% from two or more races. Hispanic or Latino of any race were 6.9% of the population.

There were 1,254 households, out of which 47.6% had children under the age of 18 living with them, 56.4% were married couples living together, 20.3% had a female householder with no husband present, and 19.1% were non-families. 15.6% of all households were made up of individuals, and 5.6% had someone living alone who was 65 years of age or older. The average household size was 2.95 and the average family size was 3.28.

In the CDP, the population was spread out, with 30.8% under the age of 18, 14.1% from 18 to 24, 23.0% from 25 to 44, 21.8% from 45 to 64, and 10.2% who were 65 years of age or older. The median age was 28.8 years. For every 100 females, there were 96.2 males. For every 100 females age 18 and over, there were 93.8 males.

The median income for a household in the CDP was $40,135, and the median income for a family was $37,299. Males had a median income of $32,308 versus $29,125 for females. The per capita income for the CDP was $11,816. About 37.8% of families and 40.8% of the population were below the poverty line, including 64.0% of those under age 18 and 13.4% of those age 65 or over.

== Education ==
The zoned school districts that include parts of the Park Hill CDP include Tahlequah Public Schools, Keys Public School, and Woodall Public School.

Sequoyah High School and Cherokee Immersion School are in Park Hill CDP.

== Parks and recreation ==
The tribal softball fields are in Park Hill.

== Notable people from Park Hill ==
- Elias Boudinot (1802-1839), editor of Cherokee Phoenix, assassinated in Park Hill
- Elias Cornelius Boudinot (1835-1890), son of Elias Boudinot, lived in Park Hill until his father's death
- Alice Brown Davis (1852–1935), Principal Chief of the Seminole Nation of Oklahoma
- John Ross (1790-1866), Principal Chief of the Cherokee Nation
- Mary G. Ross (1908-2008), the first Native American female engineer
- Tommy Wildcat (b. May 3, 1967), Native American flutist, storyteller, lecturer, and traditionalist
- Samuel Worcester (1798–1859), missionary to the Cherokee. Lived, died, and was buried in Park Hill.

== Gallery ==
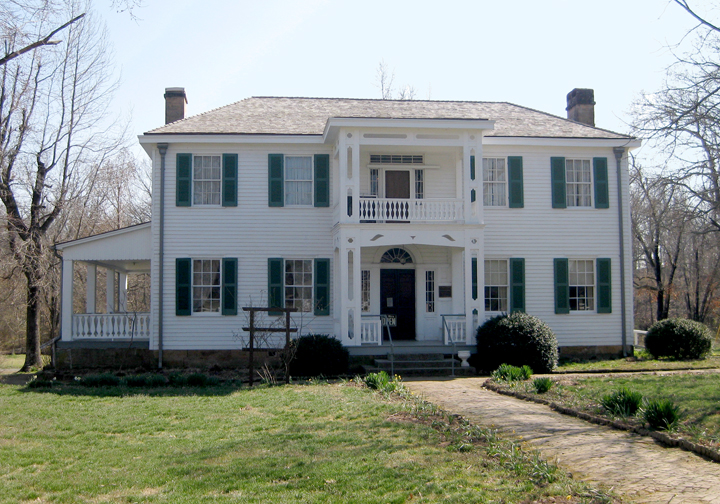
Murrell Home, built 1844-5

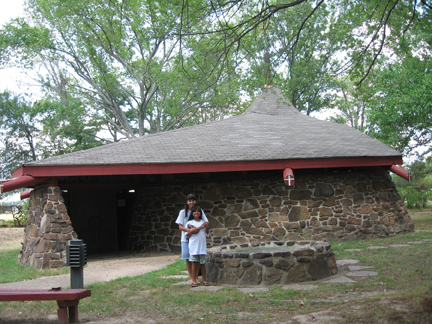
Ho-Chee-Nee Chapel at the Cherokee Heritage Center

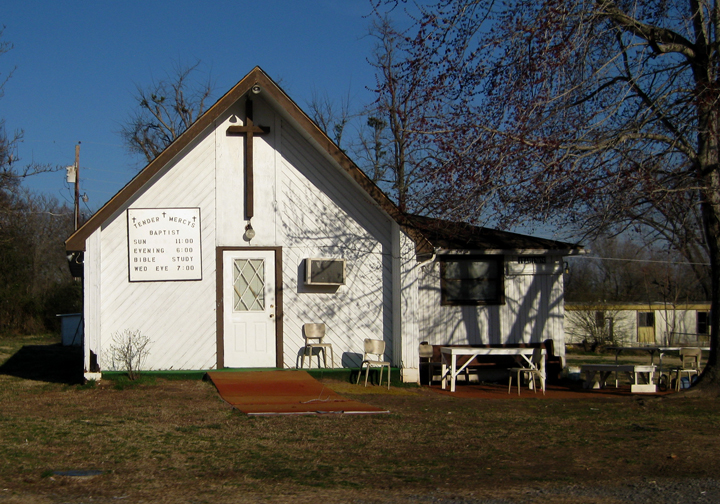
Tender Mercies Baptist Church
