= Tahlequah, Oklahoma =

City in Oklahoma, United States

Tahlequah ᏓᎵᏆ (Cherokee)
- City
- City of Tahlequah
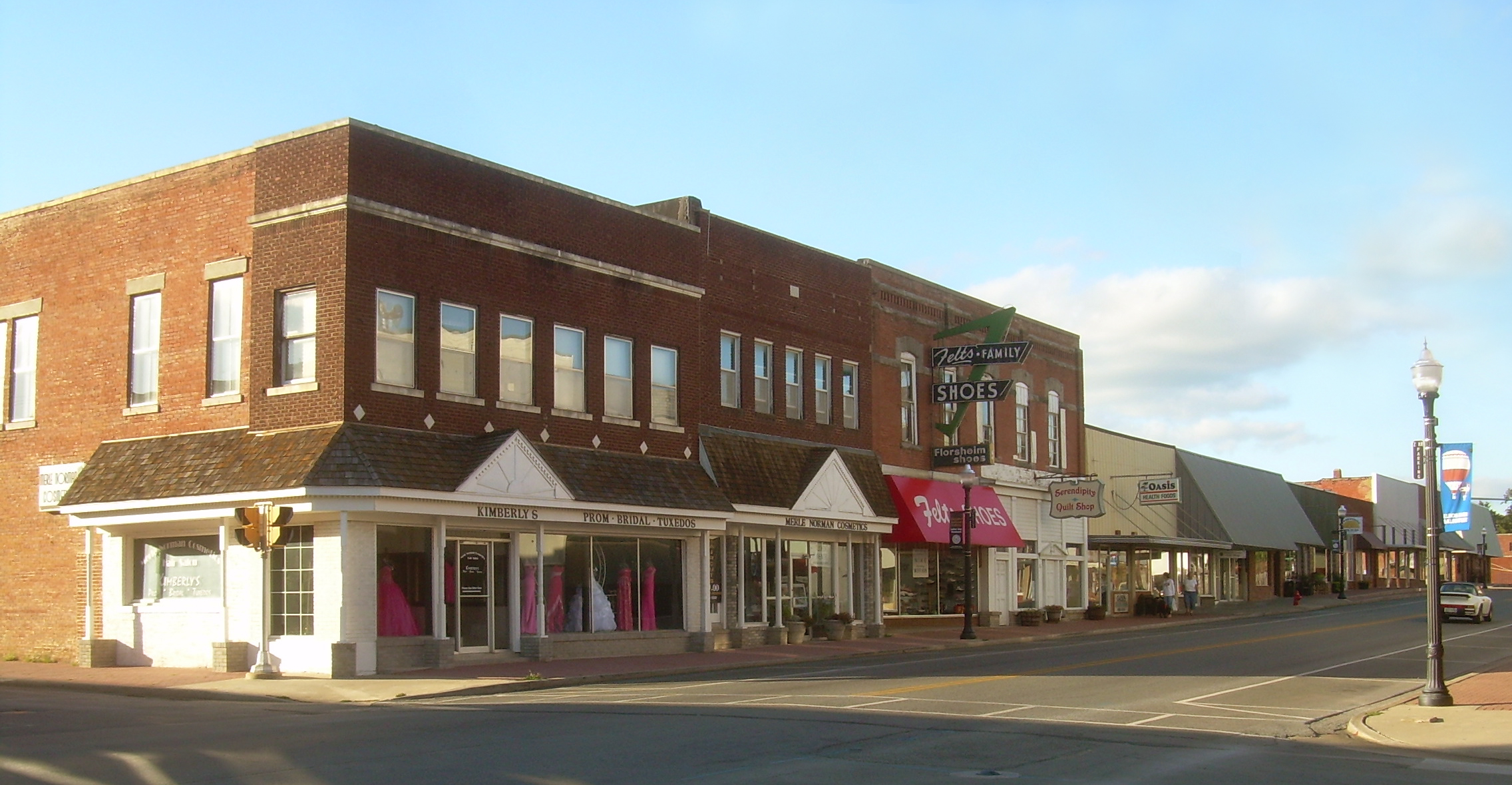
- Downtown Tahlequah
- Motto: "City of Firsts"
- Location within Cherokee County and the state of Oklahoma

- Location in the United States Tahlequah (the United States)
- Coordinates: 35°54′41″N 94°58′38″W
- Country: United States
- State: Oklahoma
- County: Cherokee
- Cherokee Nation: founded 1838; second capital city

Government
  - Mayor: Suzanne Myers

Area
  - Total: 12.87 sq mi (33.33 km^{2})
  - Land: 12.76 sq mi (33.06 km^{2})
  - Water: 0.10 sq mi (0.27 km^{2})
- Elevation: 814 ft (248 m)

Population (2020)
  - Total: 16,209
  - Density: 1,269.7/sq mi (490.24/km^{2})
- Time zone: UTC-6 (Central (CST))
  - Summer (DST): UTC-5 (CDT)
- ZIP codes: 74464-74465
- Area codes: 539/918
- FIPS code: 40-72100
- GNIS feature ID: 2412028
- Website: www.cityoftahlequah.com

Tahlequah (/ˈtæləkwɑː/ TAL-ə-kwah; Cherokee: ᏓᎵᏆ, daliqua [dàlígʷá]) is a city in Cherokee County, Oklahoma located at the foothills of the Ozark Mountains. It is part of the Green Country region of Oklahoma and was established as a capital of the 19th-century Cherokee Nation in 1839, as part of the new settlement in Indian Territory after the Cherokee Native Americans were forced west from the American Southeast on the Trail of Tears.

As of the 2020 census, Tahlequah had a population of 16,209.

Tahlequah is the county seat of Cherokee County. The main campus of Northeastern State University is located in the city.

An area just west of Tahlequah is the capital of one of the two federally recognized Cherokee tribes based in Oklahoma, the United Keetoowah Band of Cherokee Indians. The capital of the modern Cherokee Nation, the other federally recognized Cherokee tribe based in Oklahoma, is in nearby Park Hill and has a "Tahlequah" post office address city name.

== History ==
=== Background ===
Tahlonteeskee was the first established governmental capital of any kind in what was to become Oklahoma. It was established in 1828—in land that was part of 1816's Lovely Donations, becoming the first Cherokee Nation–West capital city. It continued as the capital until 1839 when new arrivals from the Trail of Tears flooded the area. At that time, Takatoka briefly became the Nation's capital during the construction of the capitol building at Tahlequah. By mid-1840, the seat of government had been officially moved to Tahlequah.

By 1842, Tahlequah was a growing community and had four stores. The town site of 160 acres (65 ha) was surveyed in 1843, and in the same year an intertribal council attracted ten thousand participants representing 21 different tribes. In 1844 the National Hotel was built, and the newspaper Cherokee Advocate issued its first edition using a printing press installed in the brand-new Supreme Court building. The first school opened in 1845, and the Tahlequah post office opened in 1847. The Cherokee Male Seminary opened in 1851, offering higher education to Cherokee boys who had already received their primary education. (Note: The Cherokee Female Seminary, which performed a parallel function for Cherokee girls, also opened in 1851 at Park Hill.)

=== Etymology ===
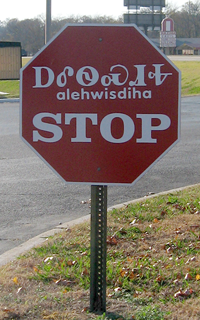
Cherokee stop sign with Cherokee language transliteration and the Cherokee syllabary in Tahlequah, Oklahoma, with "alehwisdiha" (also spelled "halehwisda") meaning "stop"

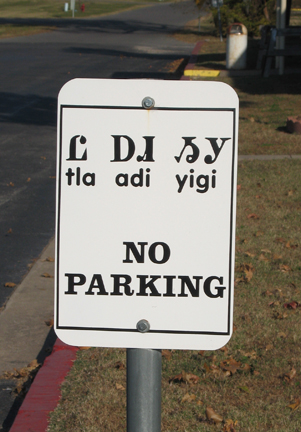
Cherokee traffic sign in Tahlequah, Oklahoma, reading "tla adi yigi", meaning "no parking" from "tla" meaning "no"

Many linguists believe the word 'Tahlequah' (Tah-le-quah) and the word 'Teh-li-co' are the same as 'di li gwa', the Cherokee word for grain or rice. (See Cherokee Nation Lexicon (dikaneisdi) at cherokee.org under culture/language). Scholars report the Cherokee word 'di li gwa' describes a type of native grain with a red hue that grew in the flat open areas of east Tennessee. One area, Great Tellico (Tellico Plains, Tennessee), was named for the grass with the red seed tops. Others interpret a word 'tel-i-quah' as 'plains'; however, there is no word for 'plains' in the Cherokee lexicon, and the word 'tel-i-quah' is not found in the lexicon. The idea that 'tahlequah' means 'plains' lends weight to the belief that the name refers to the wide open grassy areas of Great Tellico.

Local legend states the name is derived from Cherokee words 'ta-li' and 'ye-li-quu' meaning 'just two' or 'two is enough'. Supposedly three tribal elders had planned to meet to determine the location of the Cherokee Nation's permanent capital. Two elders arrived and waited for the third. As dusk approached, they decided that 'two is enough', or 'ta-li-ye-li-quu' which later became anglicanized to Tahlequah. According to tribal elders and Cherokee County elders, this legend first began to circulate in the 1930s. Tahlequah was a settlement as early as 1832. After the Western Cherokee agreed in 1834 to let the newer migrants settle near them, they joined their government with the Eastern Cherokee at Tahlequah in 1839. Tahlequah was named long before it was chosen as the Cherokee capital.

=== Cherokee Nation capital ===
In 1839, Tahlequah was designated the capital of ancestors of both the Cherokee Nation and the United Keetoowah Band of Cherokee Indians. Initially the government buildings were a complex of log or framed structures. Most of these buildings were destroyed during the Civil War, during which the Cherokee became divided into two bitterly opposing sides. The Cherokee Supreme Court Building, located in downtown Tahlequah and constructed in 1844, is the oldest public building in Oklahoma.

Several markers of Cherokee and Native American heritage are found in town: street signs and business signs are noted in both the Cherokee language and English. Such signs use the syllabary created by Sequoyah, a Cherokee scholar of the 1820s who created the writing system.

=== Post Civil War rebuilding and development ===
After the war, a brick capitol was built and first occupied in 1870. In 1907, at the time of Oklahoma statehood, the building was converted into the Cherokee County courthouse. It was returned to the Cherokee Nation in 1970.

In 1886, the first telephone company in Indian Territory was built. The Cherokee Female Seminary, which had originally been constructed in Park Hill, burned in 1887, and was rebuilt in Tahlequah. After statehood, it was taken over by the state to become Northeastern State Normal School and the Northeastern State Teachers College (now Northeastern State University). The first bank in the Cherokee Nation opened in 1891 on Muskogee Avenue.

A major fire destroyed much of downtown Tahlequah in 1895. The buildings destroyed were mostly wooden and were replaced with brick structures.

In 1902, the Ozark and Cherokee Central Railway (Note: OCCR was soon afterwards bought by the St. Louis and San Francisco Railway (aka Frisco).) built a line into Tahlequah.

Tahlequah continued to grow. During the 1990s, it was the fourth fastest growing city in Oklahoma.

== Geography ==
Tahlequah has a total area of 12.45 square miles (32.2 km^{2}), all land. The city is 40 miles (64 km) west of the Arkansas state line.

== Climate ==
Tahlequah, like most of the Southern United States, has a humid subtropical climate (Köppen Cfa) with uncomfortably hot and humid summers, generally warm but very variable springs and autumns, and cool winters with frequent frosts and occasional spells of severe weather dominated by cold, dry Canadian air.

Climate data for Tahlequah 1981-2010, extremes 1900-2008
| Month | Jan | Feb | Mar | Apr | May | Jun | Jul | Aug | Sep | Oct | Nov | Dec | Year |
|---|---|---|---|---|---|---|---|---|---|---|---|---|---|
| Record high °F (°C) | 78 (26) | 88 (31) | 96 (36) | 94 (34) | 97 (36) | 108 (42) | 118 (48) | 118 (48) | 109 (43) | 98 (37) | 89 (32) | 80 (27) | 118 (48) |
| Mean daily maximum °F (°C) | 49.0 (9.4) | 54.0 (12.2) | 63.4 (17.4) | 72.1 (22.3) | 78.5 (25.8) | 85.5 (29.7) | 90.8 (32.7) | 91.5 (33.1) | 83.5 (28.6) | 73.0 (22.8) | 61.4 (16.3) | 50.2 (10.1) | 71.1 (21.7) |
| Mean daily minimum °F (°C) | 27.1 (−2.7) | 31.5 (−0.3) | 39.8 (4.3) | 48.4 (9.1) | 57.3 (14.1) | 65.0 (18.3) | 69.2 (20.7) | 68.1 (20.1) | 60.4 (15.8) | 49.5 (9.7) | 39.5 (4.2) | 29.5 (−1.4) | 48.8 (9.3) |
| Record low °F (°C) | −23 (−31) | −13 (−25) | −10 (−23) | 19 (−7) | 30 (−1) | 41 (5) | 40 (4) | 45 (7) | 28 (−2) | 16 (−9) | 6 (−14) | −14 (−26) | −23 (−31) |
| Average precipitation inches (mm) | 2.58 (66) | 2.65 (67) | 4.10 (104) | 4.03 (102) | 6.26 (159) | 5.20 (132) | 4.40 (112) | 3.87 (98) | 5.14 (131) | 4.61 (117) | 4.30 (109) | 3.09 (78) | 50.23 (1,275) |
| Average snowfall inches (cm) | 2.1 (5.3) | 1.9 (4.8) | 1.0 (2.5) | 0.0 (0.0) | 0.0 (0.0) | 0.0 (0.0) | 0.0 (0.0) | 0.0 (0.0) | 0.0 (0.0) | 0.0 (0.0) | 0.2 (0.51) | 0.9 (2.3) | 6.1 (15.41) |
| Average precipitation days (≥ 0.01 in) | 6 | 6 | 7 | 9 | 9 | 8 | 6 | 6 | 7 | 6 | 6 | 6 | 82 |
Source: WRCC

== Demographics ==
Historical population
| Census | Pop. | Note | %± |
|---|---|---|---|
| 1900 | 1,482 | | — |
| 1910 | 2,891 | | 95.1% |
| 1920 | 2,271 | | −21.4% |
| 1930 | 2,495 | | 9.9% |
| 1940 | 3,027 | | 21.3% |
| 1950 | 4,750 | | 56.9% |
| 1960 | 5,840 | | 22.9% |
| 1970 | 9,254 | | 58.5% |
| 1980 | 9,708 | | 4.9% |
| 1990 | 10,398 | | 7.1% |
| 2000 | 14,458 | | 39.0% |
| 2010 | 15,753 | | 9.0% |
| 2020 | 16,209 | | 2.9% |
Sources: U.S. Decennial Census

=== 2020 census ===
As of the 2020 census, Tahlequah had a population of 16,209. The median age was 30.6 years. 21.8% of residents were under the age of 18 and 14.6% of residents were 65 years of age or older. For every 100 females there were 88.7 males, and for every 100 females age 18 and over there were 86.3 males age 18 and over.

97.5% of residents lived in urban areas, while 2.5% lived in rural areas.

There were 6,427 households in Tahlequah, of which 29.6% had children under the age of 18 living in them. Of all households, 33.3% were married-couple households, 22.4% were households with a male householder and no spouse or partner present, and 36.0% were households with a female householder and no spouse or partner present. About 35.4% of all households were made up of individuals and 12.8% had someone living alone who was 65 years of age or older.

There were 7,443 housing units, of which 13.7% were vacant. Among occupied housing units, 39.6% were owner-occupied and 60.4% were renter-occupied. The homeowner vacancy rate was 2.5% and the rental vacancy rate was 13.1%.

Racial composition as of the 2020 census
| Race | Percent |
|---|---|
| White | 42.9% |
| Black or African American | 1.9% |
| American Indian and Alaska Native | 32.3% |
| Asian | 1.3% |
| Native Hawaiian and Other Pacific Islander | <0.1% |
| Some other race | 4.5% |
| Two or more races | 17.1% |
| Hispanic or Latino (of any race) | 10.2% |

=== 2010 census ===
As of the 2010 census, there were 15,753 people, 6,111 households, and 3,351 families residing in the city. The population density was 1,312.75 inhabitants per square mile (506.86/km^{2}). There were 6,857 housing units at an average density of 571.4 per square mile (220.6/km^{2}). The racial makeup of the city was 53.8% White, 2.4% African American, 30.0% Native American, 1.3% Asian, 0.0% Pacific Islander, 3.7% from other races, and 8.7% from two or more races. Hispanic or Latino of any race were 9.8% of the population.

Out of 6,111 households, 25.9% had children under the age of 18 living with them, 35.5% were married couples living together, 14.3% had a female householder with no husband present, and 45.2% were non-families. 34.3% of all households were made up of individuals, and 10.9% had someone living alone who was 65 years of age or older. The average household size was 2.31 and the average family size was 2.99.

In the city, the population was spread out, with 21.1% under the age of 18, 23.6% from 18 to 24, 24.3% from 25 to 44, 18.5% from 45 to 64, and 12.5% who were 65 years of age or older. The median age was 27.8 years. For every 100 females, there were 93.7 males. For every 100 females age 18 and over, there were 91.2 males.

=== American Community Survey ===
As of 2013, the median household income was $29,114 and the median family income was $43,940. Males had a median income of $32,475 versus $27,939 for females. The per capita income for the city was $17,003. About 20.7% of families and 33.3% of the population were below the poverty line, including 43.2% of those under age 18 and 21.8% of those age 65 or over.

=== Language ===
Many people in Tahlequah speak Cherokee, and there is a Cherokee language immersion school in Tahlequah, Oklahoma, that educates students from pre-school through eighth grade with the Cherokee language as the medium of instruction, and no English.

== Education ==
=== Primary and secondary education ===
Most of the city is zoned to Tahlequah Public Schools, while portions are zoned to Briggs Public School.

Education within the Tahlequah city limits consists of one early learning center serving students in Pre-K: Sequoyah; three elementary schools serving students in Kindergarten through 5th grade: Greenwood, Cherokee, and Heritage; one middle school with grades 6 through 8: Tahlequah Middle School; and one high school with grades 9-12: Tahlequah High School. Tahlequah High School serves as the main high school within the county as well and is fed by other rural Pre-K through 8th grade schools within Cherokee County.

The following schools have Tahlequah postal addresses but are in the Park Hill census-designated place.

- Cherokee Immersion School
- Sequoyah Schools

=== Colleges ===
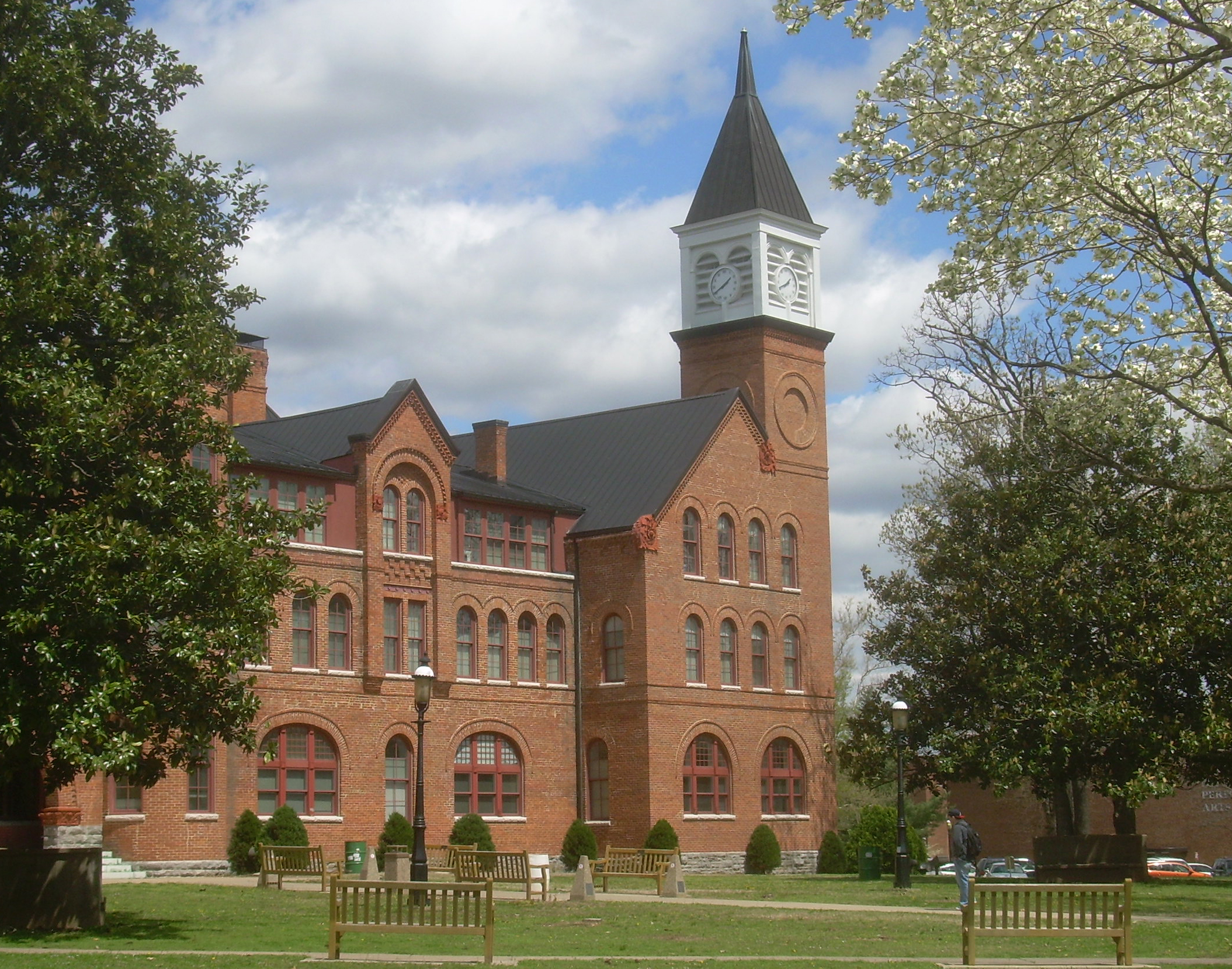
Tahlequah is home to Northeastern State University.

Northeastern State University is the oldest institution of higher learning in the state of Oklahoma as well as one of the oldest institutions of higher learning west of the Mississippi River. Tahlequah is home to the capital of the Cherokee Nation of Oklahoma and about 25 percent of the students at NSU identify themselves as American Indian. The university has many courses focused on Native American linguistics, and offers Cherokee language Education as a major. Cherokee can be studied as a second language, and some classes are taught in Cherokee for first language speakers as well.

The Oklahoma State University Center for Health Sciences (OSU-CHS) maintains a branch campus for its College of Osteopathic Medicine in affiliation with the Cherokee Nation. It is the first Native American tribally-affiliated medical school in the United States. Part of the school's mission is to increase access to healthcare in rural areas of Oklahoma, where there are significant populations of tribal citizens.

== Culture ==
=== Cherokee National Supreme Court Museum ===
The building that once housed the Supreme Court of the Cherokee Nation has been converted into a museum, the Cherokee National Supreme Court Museum and is open to the public. It reportedly is the oldest public building in Oklahoma. (Note: The museum is normally open 10 AM - 4 PM, Monday through Friday. The street address is 122 East Keetowah Street, Tahlequah.) It was constructed on the southeast corner of the town square by James S. Pierce in 1844. The first chief justice of the Cherokee Nation, John Martin held court here. The printing press for the early-day Cherokee Phoenix newspaper was also located in this building, and a reproduction of the press and the newsroom can be seen here.

=== Cherokee National History Museum ===
The Cherokee National Capitol building was built on the town square in 1869. It contained the nation's executive and legislative offices until the tribal national government was dissolved in 1906, in preparation for Oklahoma's statehood. (Note: The Supreme Court met in this building until 2018.) The building is listed on the National Register of Historic Places (NRHP) and is designated as a National Landmark.

The museum contains 4,000 square feet (370 m^{2}) of space for permanent exhibits and 1,000 square feet (93 m^{2}) of rotating gallery space. Exhibits include not only works by Cherokee artists, but also artifacts loaned by the collections of the Cherokee Nation Archives, Gilcrease Museum, Smithsonian Institution and the Oklahoma Historical Society.

== Notable people ==
- Angela Barker-Jones, Cherokee jurist
- Roy Boney, Jr., animator, artist, graphic novelist, language advocate
- Tyler Bunch, puppeteer
- Robert J. Conley, author
- Butch Davis, head football coach, University of North Carolina (2007–2011), former head coach, University of Miami (1995–2000)
- Evan Felker lead singer of the Tahlequah-based Red Dirt Country band Turnpike Troubadours
- Tina Glory-Jordan Cherokee Nation supreme court justice (2023–present) secretary of state (2019–2023), tribal councilor (2007–2015)
- Bill Harrelson, Major League Baseball pitcher
- Wanda Hatfield, Cherokee Nation tribal councilor (2015–2019)
- Ryan Helsley, Major League Baseball pitcher
- Sara E. Hill, federal judge for the United States District Court for the Northern District of Oklahoma
- Adrian Houser Professional pitcher for the San Francisco Giants
- Murv Jacob, artist and illustrator, owned an art gallery and studio in Tahlequah for three decades, where he died.
- Stacy Leeds, tribal judge, Indian law professor, Dean of University of Arkansas School of Law
- Ronald G. Lewis, social worker and professor
- Wilma Mankiller, born in Tahlequah, first female Principal Chief of the Cherokee Nation
- Robert Presley, former Riverside County (CA) Undersheriff, California State Senator (1975-1995)
- Malcolm Rodriguez, Professional football for the Detroit Lions
- Sonny Sixkiller, football player
- Chaske Spencer, Actor, born in Tahlequah, member of the Lakota Sioux Nation.
- Chad "Corntassel" Smith, author, lawyer, and former Principal Chief of the Cherokee Nation
- Wes Studi, actor, born in Tahlequah
- Johnny Tiger Jr., artist
- Florence Owens Thompson, subject of Dorothea Lange's famous photograph Migrant Mother
- Merle Travis, country singer and musician, 1917–1983; died at his home in Tahlequah
- Billy Ray Waldon, former fugitive on the Ten Most Wanted Fugitives List, American Indian Movement activist, and Esperantist

== In media ==
- Tahlequah is featured in the well-known books Where the Red Fern Grows and Summer of the Monkeys by Wilson Rawls.
- Tahlequah was once named as the fictional "home office" for the Top Ten Lists on Late Night with David Letterman.
- Tahlequah is mentioned several times in Mark Twain's 1892 novel The American Claimant as the origin of a bank robber named One-Armed Pete.
- Tahlequah is visited by the main characters in "Westward of the Law" by Matt Braun.
- Tahlequah is the principal location in Larry McMurtry's "Zeke and Ned."
- In The Burning Maze by Rick Riordan, Cherokee demigoddess Piper McLean relocates to Tahlequah.
- Starcarbon by Ellen Gilchrist takes place largely in Tahlequah.
- Tahlequah is featured in the Newbery Medal winning civil war novel Rifles for Watie written in 1957 by Harold Keith.
