= Oxnard High School =

Public school in California, United States

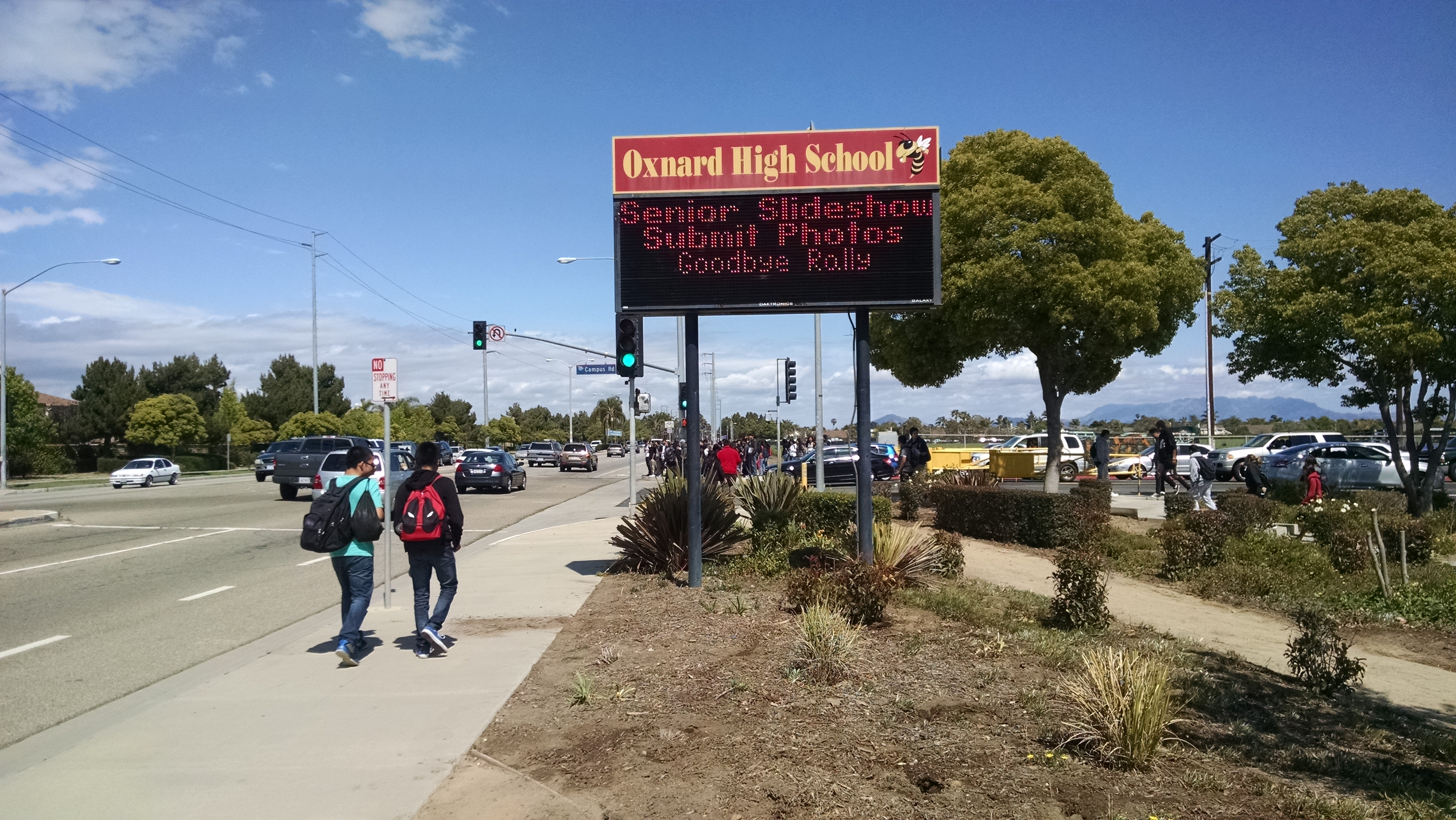

Location
- 3400 W. Gonzales Road; Oxnard, California, United States; 34°13′07″N 119°12′51″W

Information
- Type: Public
- Motto: Keep Making the Sting Mean!
- Established: 1902
- School district: Oxnard Union High School District
- Principal: Ted Lawrence
- Staff: 113.05 (FTE)
- Enrollment: 2,593 (2023–2024)
- Student to teacher ratio: 22.94
- Campus: Urban
- Colors: Cardinal and Gold
- Athletics conference: CIF Southern Section; Channel League
- Nickname: Yellowjackets
- Website: www.oxnardhigh.us

Oxnard High School (OHS) is a public four-year high school serving grades 9–12 in Oxnard, California. The school is part of the Oxnard Union High School District and serves students in the western portion of the city of Oxnard, north Port Hueneme, and adjacent unincorporated beach neighborhoods.

== History ==
Oxnard High School was established in 1902 as the first public high school in the city of Oxnard (the private Santa Clara High School opened the year before). The original campus, a 35-acre (14 ha) site on Fifth Street west of downtown, served all of the Oxnard Plain and the Conejo Valley until 1956 when Adolfo Camarillo High School opened. However, the school eventually stood in the flight path of Oxnard Airport, which opened in 1934 and presented a safety hazard. In 1995, the Oxnard Union High School District opened a new OHS campus on approximately 80 acres (32 ha) of farmland in northwest Oxnard. The city of Oxnard later purchased the Fifth Street site with the intent to repurpose it as a recreational complex. While some of the old school buildings remained intact, including a gymnasium used by the Police Activities League, most of the campus was demolished in 2008.

On March 16, 2020 due to fears of spreading COVID-19, the school closed down their campus. Virtual learning was established as a safer alternative for students to attend classes. On July 13, 2020, Oxnard High School held a graduation ceremony in which followed social distancing guidelines. The Ceremony featured a car paraded that took place in the school's parking lot. The mural at the front of the school was created by the class of 2020, whose senior year was interrupted by the COVID-19 pandemic. They used funds they had raised for their prom and other events which had been canceled.

== Athletics ==
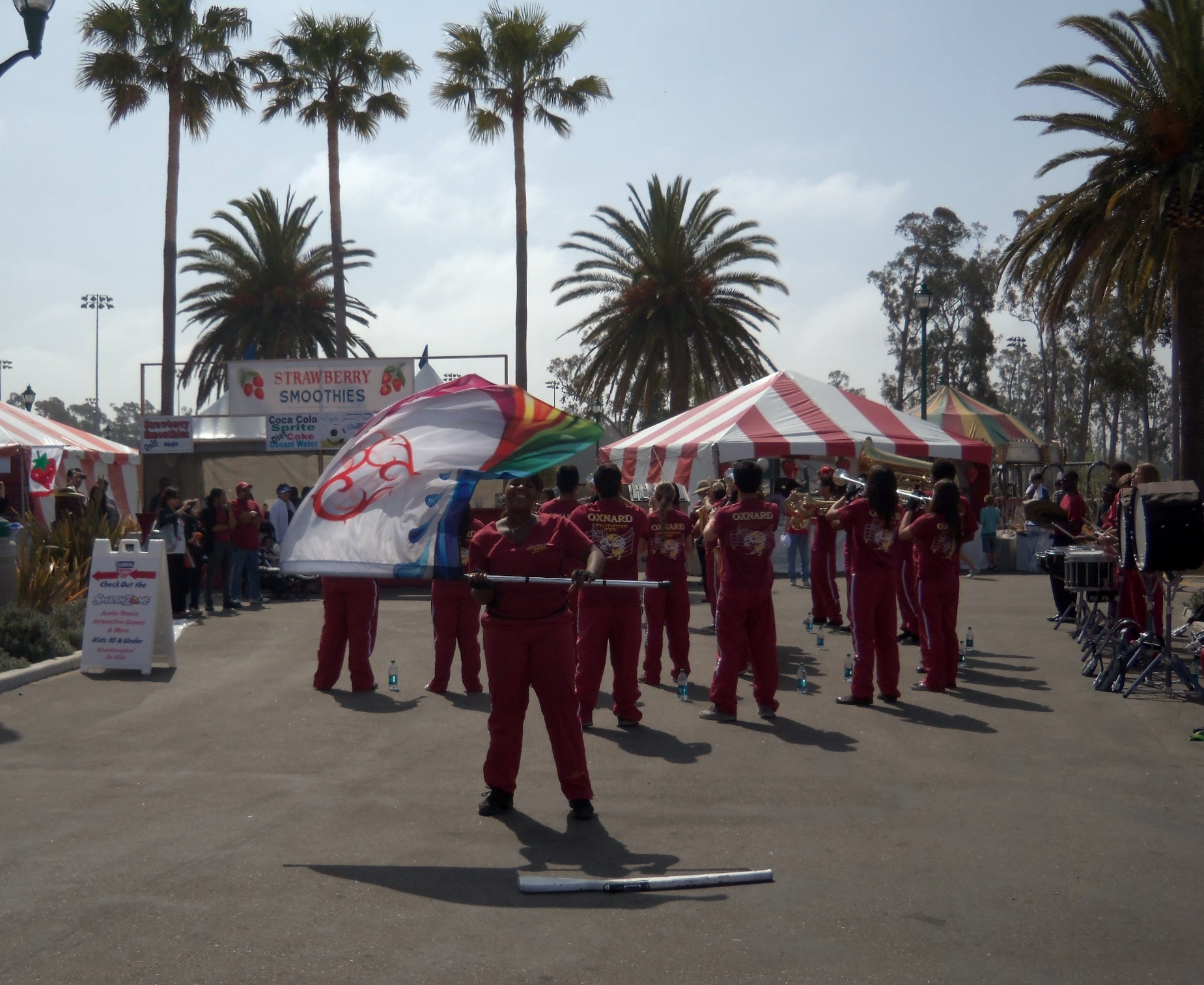
Oxnard High School Marching Band performing at the California Strawberry Festival at College Park

Oxnard High School athletic teams are nicknamed the Yellowjackets. The school is a charter member of the Pacific View League, a conference within the CIF Southern Section (CIF-SS) that was established in 1998.

The OHS football team won a CIF-SS championship in 1928.

The Oxnard girls' soccer team won the CIF-State SoCal Division III regional championship in 2020. The Yellowjackets also won a CIF-SS title in 2016.

== Notable alumni ==
- Timmy Curran, professional surfer, musician and spokesperson for Surfrider Foundation
- Kevin Faulconer, mayor of San Diego 2014–20
- Bud Houser, three-time Olympic gold medalist, held world record in discus
- Denny Lemaster, former Major League Baseball pitcher with Milwaukee/Atlanta Braves, Houston Astros, and Montreal Expos
- Bismarck Lepe, CEO of internet video company Ooyala
- Kristal Marshall, model and WWE wrestler
- Paul McAnulty, former MLB outfielder with San Diego Padres
- Ken McMullen, former MLB third baseman with Los Angeles Dodgers
- Rich Moore, animation director, screenwriter, voice actor, creative partner at Rough Draft Studios and Walt Disney Animation Studios
- Jack O'Connell, 26th California State Superintendent of Public Instruction
- Corey Pavin, professional golfer, 1995 U.S. Open champion
- Alfred V. Rascon, retired U.S. Army lieutenant colonel and Medal of Honor recipient
- Jacob Rogers, professional football player, All-American for USC Trojans
- Nao Takasugi, mayor of Oxnard 1982–92, member of California State Assembly 1992–98
- Terrell Watson, professional football player for New York Giants
- Steve Zaragoza, YouTube personality, comedian, SourceFed host
