= Andrew Cunningham =

Andrew or Andy Cunningham may refer to:

- Andy Cunningham (footballer) (1891–1973), Scottish football player and coach
- Andy Cunningham (actor) (1950–2017), English actor
- Andrew Cunningham, 1st Viscount Cunningham of Hyndhope (1883–1963), British admiral of the Second World War
- Andrew Cunningham (politician) (1910–2010), British politician, jailed for corruption
- Andrew Cunningham (CEO), chief executive of Grainger plc
- Andrew B. Cunningham (Cherokee chief)
- Andrew Chase Cunningham, American civil engineer and fencing master, wrote The Cane as a Weapon
- Murder of Andrew Cunningham (died 2008)

== See also ==
- Andrew Cunningham Farm, near Virginia, Illinois, historic building
