= Andrew B. Cunningham =

Andrew B. Cunningham may refer to:

- Andrew Cunningham, 1st Viscount Cunningham of Hyndhope, British admiral
- Andrew B. Cunningham (Cherokee chief)

== See also ==
- Andrew Cunningham (disambiguation)
