= Strawberry festival =

Festival involving strawberries

A strawberry festival is an event and celebration in many towns in North America. In most instances, areas around these towns are, or have been, deeply involved in the production and marketing of strawberries, and the festivals are usually held in late spring around the time of the strawberry harvest. Such festivals generally involve a parade and other community events and the consumption of the fruit, and may attract visitors from other places.

== Festivals by country ==
=== United States ===
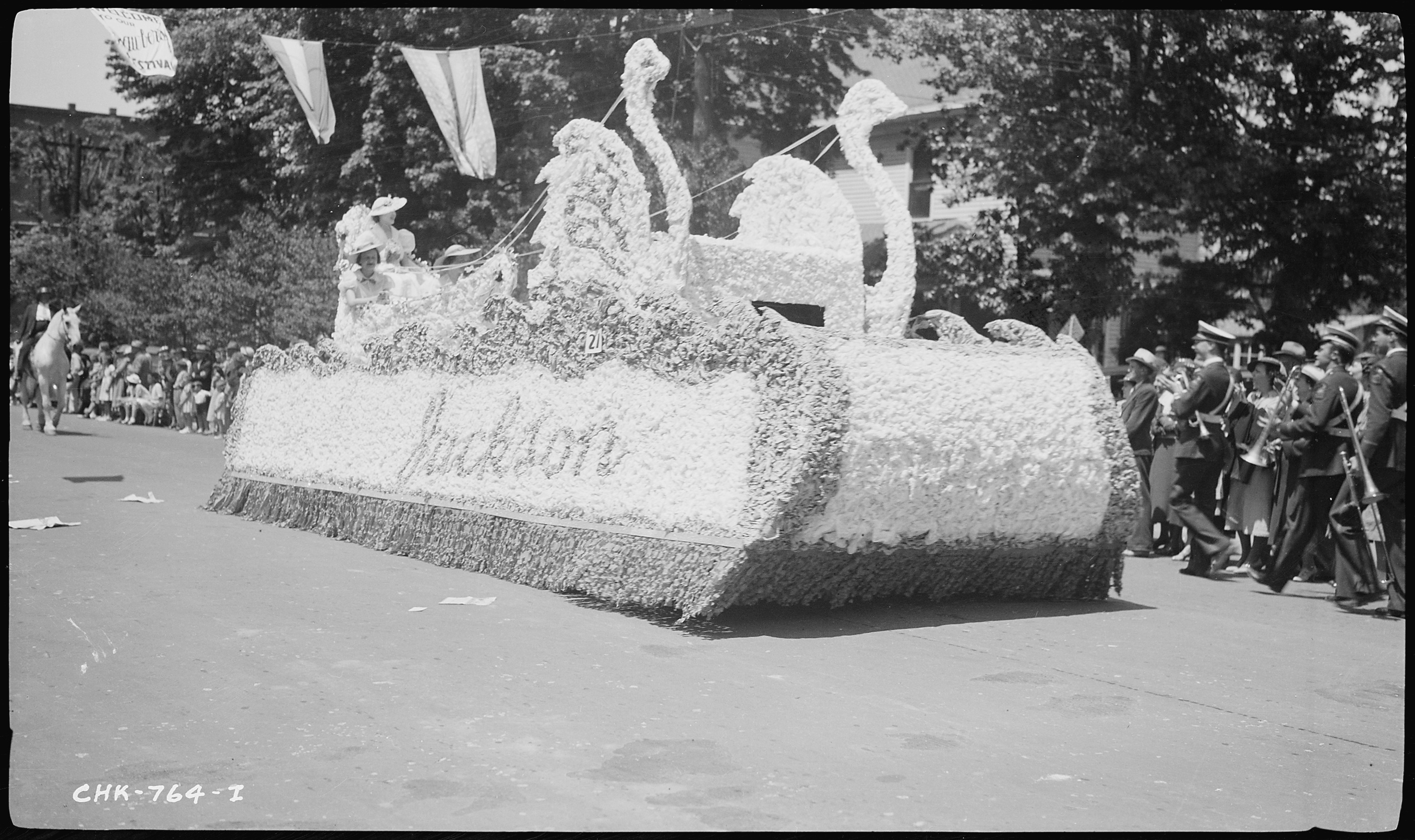
A float in a Strawberry Festival in Jackson, Tennessee in 1937.

- Arroyo Grande, California – Memorial Day weekend
- Assonet, Massachusetts – Father's Day
- Belleville, Michigan – National Strawberry Festival
- Bellevue, Washington
- Billings, Montana Strawberry Festival
- Buckhannon, West Virginia – West Virginia Strawberry Festival
- Wisconsin
- Cabot, Arkansas
- Chassell, Michigan
- Crawfordsville, Indiana
- Dayton, Tennessee – Tennessee Strawberry Festival (Dayton, Tennessee)
- Fort Mill, South Carolina
- Garden Grove, California
- Humboldt, Tennessee – Strawberry Festival (Humboldt, Tennessee)
- Kirtland, Ohio
- Lebanon, Oregon – Strawberry Festival (Lebanon, Oregon)
- Lahaska, Pennsylvania – Peddler's Village Strawberry Festival
- Lincolnville, Maine – Strawberry Festival (Lincolnville, Maine)
- Long Grove, Illinois
- Los Gatos, California
- Mattituck, New York– 2nd week of June
- Marysville, Washington – 3rd week of June
- Newark, Ohio
- North Canton, Connecticut, at the North Canton Community United Methodist Church, Saturday before Father's Day
- Owego, New York – 3rd Saturday in June
- Oxnard Plain – California Strawberry Festival, 3rd weekend in May
- Pasadena, Texas – May 16, 17 and 18, 2008
- Ponchatoula, Louisiana – April 3–5
- Plant City, Florida – the Florida Strawberry Festival, next on March 2 – March 12, 2023
- Portland, Tennessee – Strawberry Festival (Portland, Tennessee)
- Poteet, Texas – Strawberry Festival
- Pungo, Virginia Strawberry Festival
- Rehoboth, Massachusetts – First Sunday in June
- Sandy Spring, Maryland
- Santa Maria, California
- Schodack, New York – Strawberry Festival (Schodack, New York)
- South Berwick, Maine
- South Windsor, Connecticut
- Stilwell, Oklahoma
- Troy, Ohio – Strawberry Festival (Troy, Ohio)
- Vashon Island, Washington
- Vanceboro, North Carolina

=== Brazil ===
- Brasília
- Gravatá
- Nova Friburgo

=== Australia ===
- Cleveland, Queensland (1965–2001)

=== Philippines ===
- La Trinidad, Benguet – In March 2015, 6,000 slices of strawberry cake were served as part of the events at this municipality's Strawberry Festival. The cakes for the slices were prepared using fresh strawberries.

=== Finland ===
- Suonenjoki – In July, the so-called "the Strawberry Town" hosts an annual "Strawberry Carnival" (Finnish: Mansikkakarnevaalit).

=== India ===
- Panchgani
