= Andrew Cunningham (CEO) =

Andrew Cunningham was the chief executive of the FTSE 250 Index listed company Grainger plc. He retired from the position in February 2016 and was replaced by Helen Gordon.
