= College Park, California =

College Park, California may refer to:

- College Park, San Jose, a historic neighborhood in Silicon Valley, California
  - College Park station (Caltrain)
- College Park (Bakersfield), a park in Kern County, California
- College Park (Claremont), a park in Los Angeles County, California
- College Park (Davis), a park in Yolo County, California
- College Park (Dinuba), a park in Tulare County, California
- College Park (Huntington Beach), a park in Orange County, California
- College Park (Irvine), a community and park in Orange County, California
- College Park (Lompoc), a park in Santa Barbara County, California
- College Park (Oxnard), a municipal park in Ventura County, California
- College Park High School (Pleasant Hill, California)
