= Thomas Buffington =

American politician and judge (1855–1938)

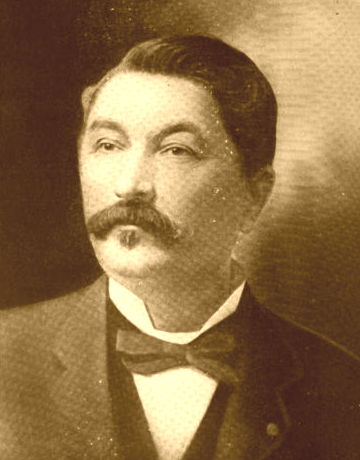

Principal Chief of the Cherokee Nation
- In office 1899–1903
- Preceded by: Samuel Houston Mayes
- Succeeded by: W.C. Rogers
- In office December 14, 1891 – December 23, 1891
- Preceded by: Joel B. Mayes
- Succeeded by: Johnson Harris

President of the Cherokee Senate
- In office 1891–1893

Member of the Cherokee Senate from the Delaware District
- In office 1891–1893

Mayor of Vinita
- In office 1893–1899
- In office 1903–1917

Personal details
- Born: October 15, 1855 Cherokee Nation, Indian Territory (now Adair County, Oklahoma)
- Died: February 11, 1938 (aged 83) Vinita, Oklahoma
- Citizenship: Cherokee Nation; American
- Party: Downing Party
- Other political affiliations: Democratic

Thomas Mitchell Buffington (1855-1938) was a Cherokee Nation politician and an elected district judge.

He was born October 15, 1855, in Going Snake District of the Cherokee Nation, Indian Territory, now in Adair County, Oklahoma. His parents were Ezekiel Buffington, who was born in Georgia in 1807 and settled in Oklahoma Territory in 1835 as part of the Cherokee diaspora. His mother was Louisa (Newman) Buffington, who was born in Tennessee in 1817 and died in 1898. Buffington was one of eight children.

The family lived near Westville and Buffington attended the Baptist Mission School, which was a public school operated by the Cherokee Nation. His teacher was the Cherokee educator Carrie E. Bushyhead. He married Susie Woodall in 1878 (b.1857-d.1891); she was a school teacher. Four years after his first wife's death, he married E. Gray, a teacher in the Cherokee schools.

Thomas Buffington became active in Cherokee politics and aligned himself with the Downing party. In 1889 he was elected district judge for the Delaware district, but resigned in order to serve as senator, for which he was elected in 1891. He served as temporary Principal Chief of the Cherokee Nation from the 14th to the 23rd of December, 1891, upon the deaths of the Principal Chief Joel B. Mayes and the Second Chief Henry Chambers, as he had right of succession, being president of the Senate. He was appointed as a delegate to Washington, D.C. to represent the Cherokee Nation before the United States Congress. There he supported passage of the Curtis Act of 1898, which weakened tribal governments, brought all persons in the territory under federal law, and facilitated land allotments.

He later served as mayor of Vinita. In 1899 he resigned as mayor and ran for the office of Principal Chief and won, serving until 1903.

After serving as Principal Chief for the second time, Buffington served as mayor of Vinita till 1917. He died in Vinita, Oklahoma on February 11, 1938.

| Preceded by Samuel Houston Mayes | Principal Chief of the Cherokee Nation; 1899–1903 | Succeeded by William Charles Rogers |
