= Samuel Houston Mayes =

19th century Principal Chief of the Cherokee Nation (1845–1927)

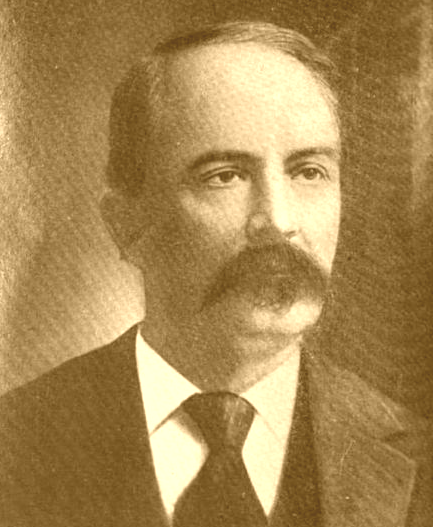
Samuel Houston Mayes, c. 1921

Samuel Houston Mayes (May 11, 1845 – December 12, 1927) of Scots/English-Cherokee descent, was elected as Principal Chief of the Cherokee Nation in Indian Territory (present-day Oklahoma), serving from 1895 to 1899. His maternal grandfather belonged to the Deer clan, and his father was allied with members of the Cherokee Treaty Party in the 1830s, such as the Adair men, Elias Boudinot, and Major Ridge. In the late nineteenth century, his older brother Joel B. Mayes was elected to two terms as Chief of the Cherokee.

Born in Indian Territory, Mayes attended a Cherokee school, served with the Confederacy during the American Civil War, and become a cattle rancher before entering politics. He was elected as the United States was dissolving tribal governments and communal lands, and making allotments in severalty to individual households of Native Americans, in an effort to force assimilation, under the Dawes and Curtis acts.

== Background ==
Samuel Houston Mayes was born May 11, 1845, near Stilwell, Oklahoma to Samuel and Nancy (Adair) Mayes. His mother Nancy Adair was of Scots-Cherokee descent, a granddaughter of Ga-hoga, a full-blood Cherokee woman of the Deer clan. Her father was of mixed race and belonged to his mother's clan, as the Cherokee were a matrilineal society, and children took their status from the mother. With his marriage, Samuel Mayes (1803–1858) was taken into the Adair family and the Cherokee community. His son Samuel was named for his father's friend Samuel Houston, a notable acquaintance from Tennessee. The Mayes migrated early to Indian Territory, together with the Adairs, Boudinots, Ridges and others of the Treaty Party.

Samuel's older brother was Joel B. Mayes (1833–1891), who was elected chief of the Cherokee in 1887 and 1891. Another older brother, Francis, was killed returning from California. Samuel attended the Muddy Springs School, located about three miles from the family's home in Stilwell. The school was part of the Cherokee public school system and one of his teachers there was the noted Cherokee educator Carrie Bushyhead. All of his younger brothers attended this school before each obtained their high schooling at the Cherokee Male Seminary in Tahlequah.

At age 16, Samuel Mayes volunteered for the Confederate Army in the American Civil War, serving in Company K, under Capt. Benjamin F. Carter and in the 2nd Cherokee Regiment under Col. Clem Vann through the war. Afterward he worked in Texas, then returned to Indian Territory, where he started to get involved in the stock business. He and his brother both worked in the cattle business, which was expanding with the use of Texas longhorn cattle and drives to get the cattle to the northern railroad heads.

== Marriage and family ==
Mayes married Martha Elizabeth Vann (1852–1907) on November 9, 1871. From another prominent Cherokee family, she also was of mixed race. They had three children who survived: William Lucullis, Joseph Francis (who became a doctor), and M. Carrie Mayes, who married Clarence Samuels.

After his wife's death, on February 18, 1913, Mayes married Minnie Harrison née Ball, a widow, who survived him.

== Political career ==
In 1880 Mayes was first elected to office, as sheriff of Coo-wee-scoo-wee District. From 1885 to 1891, he served as senator from the same district. He ran on the same party as his brother had, the Downing ticket, and was elected as chief in 1895.

In 1893 Congress had created the Dawes Commission, to carry out the registration of members of Native American tribes and the allotment of communal lands, in an effort to force assimilation and provide Indians with land to own and manage. Initially the Indian Territory lands had been excluded, but Congress intended to allot those as well.

During Mayes' term as Chief beginning in 1896, the Dawes Commission took over the power of the Cherokee Nation to determine its citizenship rules. It had been established to manage a process of allotments of communal Native American lands to provide for assimilation of the people as farmers in the European-American style. In furtherance of planning to abolish tribal governments to allow the Oklahoma and Indian territories to be admitted jointly as a new state, the Dawes Commission set up to register the members of the Cherokee Nation. In 1898 the Curtis Act "dissolved tribal courts, directed a survey of the tribal lands, required that tribal rolls of membership be prepared and that the surface rights of the lands of the tribe be allotted in severalty among its members", all to achieve assimilation. The US government, through what is now called the Bureau of Indian Affairs (BIA), would appoint chiefs for the tribes. The Cherokee tried to fight this but were forced into negotiations instead. The Five Civilized Tribes finally had to agree to the allotment process.

Mayes appointed seven Cherokee delegates to the Dawes Commission on January 7, 1899. These delegates agreed to take the proposition to allot Cherokee lands and dissolve the Cherokee government to a vote. On January 31, 1899, the Cherokee voted to approve this agreement. But, the U.S. congress never ratified it. The delays of the Cherokee won them a more favorable agreement in 1902. Still, the allotment of communal lands destroyed an important community principle, that no member of the tribe would be homeless and that they could all help each other. The Cherokee lands were divided into allotments of approximately 110 acre-plots for individual households (Freedmen received 40 acres per household). The US government declared any remaining land as "surplus" and sold it to non-Native settlers.

== Death and legacy ==
Mayes died on his farm on December 12, 1927 at Pryor Creek, Oklahoma.

Mayes County, Oklahoma, where he was a longtime resident, is named in his honor.

Preceded by C. J. Harris	Principal Chief of the Cherokee Nation; 1895–1899	Succeeded by Thomas Buffington
