= Joel B. Mayes =

Cherokee chief (1833–1891)

- Tsa-wa Gak-ski
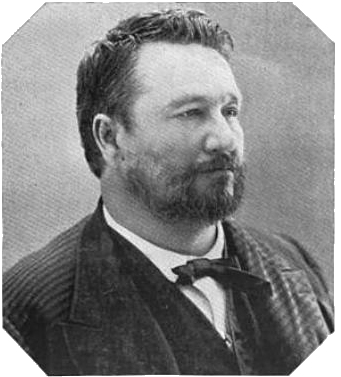

Principal Chief of the Cherokee Nation leader
- Preceded by: Dennis Bushyhead
- Succeeded by: C. J. Harris

Personal details
- Born: October 2, 1833 Cartersville, Georgia, US
- Died: December 14, 1891 (aged 58) Tahlequah, Oklahoma, US
- Resting place: Tahlequah Cemetery, Cherokee County, Oklahoma
- Spouse(s): Martha J. Candy; Martha McNair; Mary Delilah Vann Drew
- Education: Cherokee Male Seminary
- Known for: Cherokee Supreme Court justice, Cherokee Outlet sale

Joel Bryan Mayes (Tsa-wa Gak-ski, in Cherokee) (1833 – 1891) was Principal Chief of the Cherokee Nation.

== Early life and education ==
Mayes was born on October 2, 1833, in present-day Carterville, Bartow County, Georgia to the former Nancy Adair (b. 1808, and part-Cherokee) and her husband Samuel Mayes (1803-1858, and adopted into the Cherokee tribe upon his marriage in 1825). In 1838, Samuel Mayes and his family (as well as the Adair family and others of mixed Scots/Irish and Cherokee ancestry), relocated across the Mississippi River into what was then Indian Territory. Many of these "Old Settlers" had signed a removal treaty (the Treaty of New Echota) which many other Cherokee (including chief John Ross) abhorred and renounced. Samuel Mayes bred and sold livestock, and also owned many enslaved persons before his death in 1858 in what eventually became Mayes County, Oklahoma (named for him and/or his son after statehood five decades later).

Joel B. Mayes was one of Samuel Mayes's many sons. His elder brothers were George Washington Mayes (1824–1894), John Thompson Mayes (1826–1863) and Francis Asbury Mayes (1833–1863). Both of the latter accompanied their father in driving cattle to California c. 1852. While John Thompson Mayes returned with his father to Indian Territory, Francis Asbury Mayes remained in California for several years, but when returning to Oklahoma in 1863, was reported ambushed by hostile tribesman and killed. The eldest brother, Wash Mayes, would serve as high sheriff of the Cherokee Nation for many years. A younger brother Samuel Houston Mayes (1845–1927), also became a principal chief of the Cherokee Nation, and the namesake of Mayes County, Oklahoma. Other younger brothers were William Henry ("Tip") Mayes (1842–1918) and Wiley B. Mayes (1848–1934).

His half siblings can be confirmed through the Dawes applications, DNA comparisons of descendants and is also mentioned in Sarah's obituary in The Weekly Chieftain in Vinita, Oklahoma, 1st Edition, Page 3 on June 5, 1890, which quotes her as "Half sister of hon. J.B. Mayes and had a large relation." The relationship of his father with "Annie" was not clearly cited in the book by Starr, and acknowledging the practice of plural marriage was a controversial subject. It was highly debated that there was a different Samuel Mayes in the area of the time. Some genealogists also argued that Joel B. Mayes' father was unlikely to have traveled with gold and cattle to California. One genealogy website forum, as a way of mocking the genealogist's conclusion as Samuel Mayes being like Howard Hughes with a plane to do so much. It seemed to present itself as an Adair vs. them, until twenty years later with the help of DNA connecting the two lines to the same Samuel. In 2017, the Cherokee Phoenix covered the Trail of Tears survivor ceremony for Ahnawake at her grave in Oklahoma. It was the first print publication mentioning the marriage and children of the two, along with their children and half-siblings of the Adair lineage.

He attended tribal schools, then college at the Cherokee Male Seminary, graduating in 1856. He edited a small weekly newspaper there called the Sequoyah Memorial, with the motto: "Truth, Justice, Freedom of Speech and Cherokee Improvement." Mayes then taught school at Muddy Springs from 1855 to 1857, before becoming a cattleman like his father until the American Civil War.

== Family life ==
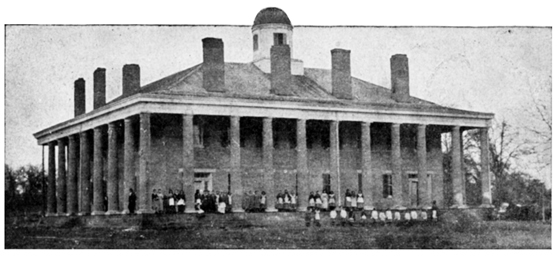
Mayes' first two wives were members of the Cherokee Female Seminary Class of 1856.

Mayes was an active Methodist and Mason, and married three times. In 1855 he married Martha J. Candy, who died two years later in the Flint District, and was buried in Salina, Oklahoma. She had graduated from the Cherokee Female Seminary in 1856. In 1863, Mayes married Martha McNair (another Female Seminary Class of 1856 graduate) in Rusk County, Texas, but she died near Durant in the Choctaw country in 1866. In 1869 Joel Mayes married widow Mary Delilah Vann Drew (1838–1912). The daughter of David and Martha (McNair) Vann of the Saline District and also a Female Seminary graduate, brought a son George N. Drew (1861–1878). She and Joel B. Mayes either had a son Thompson B. Mayes (1873–1899) or fostered his brother Wiley's son. In either event, Martha Vann Mayes would survive her second husband by more than a decade, and also outlived both her sons.

== Confederate service ==
Mayes enlisted as a private in Company A of the 1st Cherokee Regiment in the Confederate Army on September 18, 1862, and rose to captain and assistant quartermaster of the 2nd Regiment of Cherokee Mounted Volunteers the following year. On July 13, 1864, General E. K. Smith appointed Mayes major, brigade quartermaster and paymaster of the First Indian Brigade under Principal Chief and Confederate General Stand Watie, where he served until war's end. During the war, his family and other Confederate Cherokee took refuge in Rusk and Smith counties of east Texas, where Mayes married for the second time. His cousin, Joel Mayes Bryan (1809–1898), operated crucial saltworks in Adair County beginning in the 1840s.

== Postwar business and politics ==
After the war ended, Mayes returned to Bryan County, Oklahoma, but two years later, after his second wife's death, resumed his farming and ranching business along the Grand River in Mayes County.

In 1868 Mayes County voters elected Mayes the court clerk. In 1873 he was elected judge of the Northern Circuit of the Cherokee Nation. He served for five years before being appointed secretary of the Commission on Citizenship. While still secretary of the Commission on Citizenship, Mayes became clerk of the National Council. He was then named an associate justice of the Cherokee Supreme Court, which he served for one year before being elected Chief Justice by the National Council.

== Cherokee Chief ==
On August 1, 1887, after a spirited campaign and disputed election, Mayes became chieftain of the Cherokee Nation on the Downing ticket, defeating Rabbit Bunch of the National party. The National party refused to concede defeat, and the National Council refused to conduct the required canvass. However, Chief Dennis Bushyhead acknowledged Mayes as his successor and retired in January 1888, after the Downing party seized the tribal offices at Tahlequah.

However, this caused publicity and a national scandal, which ultimately caused Congress to create a federal court for the Indian Territory, undermining the tribal courts. During his administration, the Cherokee strip cattle lease sale was negotiated at a rate double the prior lease, the cattle lease negotiated by Chief Bushyhead in 1883 having a five-year term. The Cherokee Outlet sale opening lands to white settlers after massive emigration into what had been Creek tribal lands four years earlier also occurred during his administration. U.S. Judge James M. Shackelford, established the first U.S. District Court in what had been Indian Territory at Muskogee on April 1, 1889.

== Death and legacy ==
Mayes was easily re-elected to a second term as Principal Chief over George Benge on August 3, 1891. However, he died shortly thereafter, at his home in Tahlequah after a brief illness on December 14, 1891. He is buried at the Tahlequah Cemetery, Cherokee County, Oklahoma. Thomas M. Buffington briefly served as interim chief until the tribal council convened and elected C. J. Harris his successor on December 23, 1891. His brother Sam Mayes would succeed Harris as principal chief in 1895.

Preceded by Dennis Bushyhead	Principal Chief of the Cherokee Nation; 1887–1891	Succeeded by C. J. Harris
