= Smith-Dorrien House =

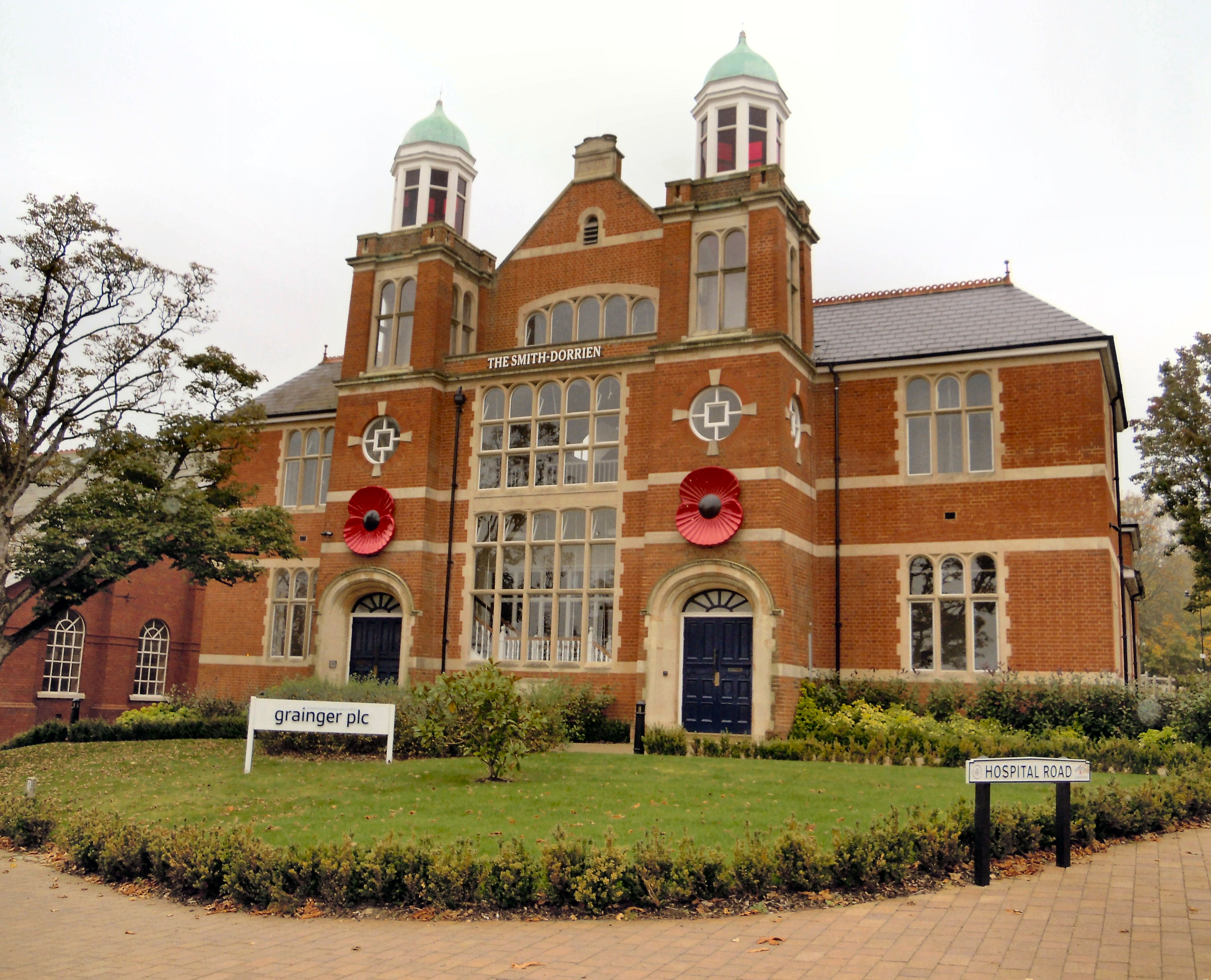
- Smith-Dorrien House
- Interactive map of the Smith-Dorrien House area

General information
- Architectural style: Victorian style
- Location: Aldershot
- Coordinates: 51.2548°N 0.7651°W
- Completed: 1908

Design and construction
- Architect: Harry Bell Measures
- Designations

Listed Building – Grade II
- Official name: Smith-Dorrien House
- Designated: 8 July 1998
- Reference no.: 1375566

Smith-Dorrien House is an office building in Aldershot, Hampshire. It is a Grade II listed building.

== History ==
The foundation stone for the building was laid by General Sir Horace Smith-Dorrien, the General Officer Commanding Aldershot Command, on 4 March 1908. The building, which was designed by Harry Bell Measures in the Victorian style, was completed circa 1909. It was initially used as a barracks institute, a social facility for soldiers to read, meet, study and play games. It was refurbished by Millgrove Construction to provide the main offices for the Wellesley Project, a major residential development by Grainger plc, in 2013.
