= Golda's Mill =

- U.S. National Register of Historic Places
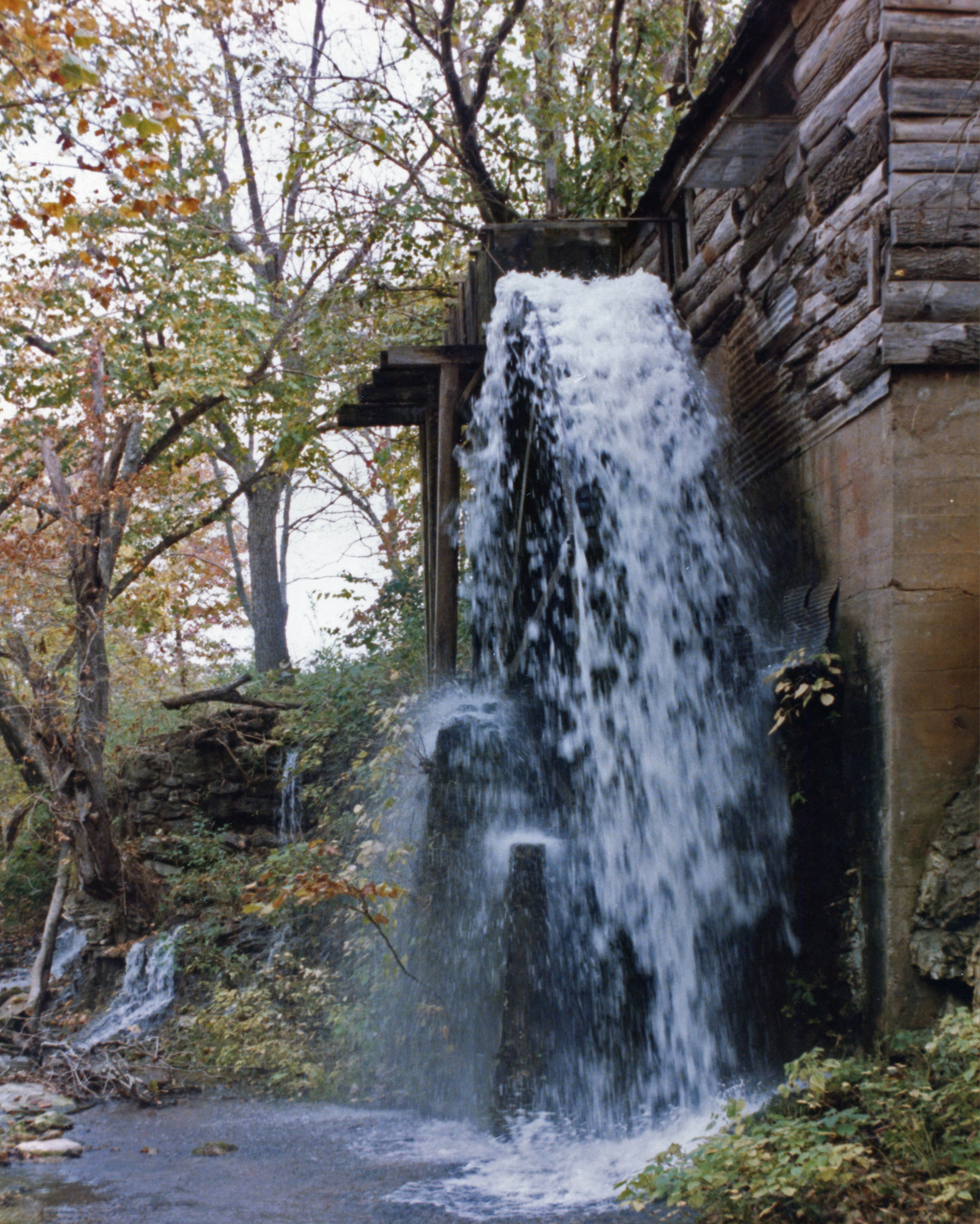

- Location within Oklahoma Location within the United States
- Nearest city: Stilwell, Oklahoma
- Coordinates: 35°51′33.95″N 94°45′53.01″W
- Built: 1830
- NRHP reference No.: 72001049
- Added to NRHP: November 9, 1972

Golda's Mill was a historic water mill in Adair County, Oklahoma near Stilwell. It was built in about 1882 by Dr. Nicholas Bitting on the site of an older mill. It had an overshot water wheel which was 20 feet in diameter. The original wooden wheel was replaced by a steel wheel in 1908. The mill was placed on the National Register of Historic Places in 1972. The mill continued in operation until 1983, when it was destroyed by fire.
