= Jacob Rogers =

American football player (born 1981)

No. 79
- Position: Offensive tackle

Personal information
- Born: August 17, 1981 (age 45); Oxnard, California, U.S.
- Listed height: 6 ft 5 in (1.96 m)
- Listed weight: 305 lb (138 kg)

Career information
- High school: Oxnard
- College: USC
- NFL draft: 2004: 2nd round, 52nd overall pick

Career history
- Dallas Cowboys (2004–2005); Denver Broncos (2007)*
- * Offseason or practice squad member only

Awards and highlights
- Morris Trophy (2003); Consensus All-American (2003); 2× First-team All-Pac-10 (2002, 2003)

Career NFL statistics
- Games Played: 2
- Stats at Pro Football Reference

Jacob Dwight Rogers (born August 17, 1981) is an American former professional football player who was an offensive tackle for the Dallas Cowboys of the National Football League (NFL). He played college football for the USC Trojans.

== Early life ==
Rogers was born in Oxnard, California. He attended Oxnard High School, where he started as a quarterback, before switching to tight end as a sophomore. He also played defensive end, linebacker and punter. As a junior, he caught 17 passes for 201 yards and 5 touchdowns.

As a senior tight end, he finished with 39 receptions for 412 yards (10.6 average yards) and 4 touchdowns, despite missing the last 4 games with a separated shoulder. He also received Super Prep All-American and All-far west honors. He averaged 10 rebounds a game as a senior for the basketball team.

== College career ==
Rogers accepted a football scholarship from the University of Southern California, where he played for head coach Pete Carroll's Trojans teams from 2000 to 2003.

As a true freshman, he missed most of the season due to a dislocated left shoulder. The next year, he came back as a redshirt freshman and was converted into an offensive tackle, playing behind left tackle Brent McCaffrey. He needed off-season surgery to repair a dislocated right shoulder.

As a sophomore, although he missed spring practice while rehabbing his shoulder, he earned the starting left tackle job. As a senior in 2003, he was one of the nation's top offensive tackles, the Morris Trophy winner, a first-team All-Pac-10 selection and a consensus first-team All-American. He was a starter in the 2003 Orange Bowl and the 2004 Rose Bowl, blocking for Carson Palmer and Matt Leinart.

== Professional career ==
Pre-draft measurables
Height	Weight	Arm length	Hand span	40-yard dash	Bench press
6 ft 6 1/8 in (1.98 m)	307 lb (139 kg)	33 1/4 in (0.84 m)	9 1/2 in (0.24 m)	5.30 s	30 reps
All values from NFL Combine

=== Dallas Cowboys ===
Rogers was selected by the Dallas Cowboys in the second round (52nd overall) of the 2004 NFL draft, after dropping because of his injury history. As a rookie, he was moved to right tackle, but couldn't win the starting position over former undrafted free agents Kurt Vollers and Torrin Tucker. He dressed but did not participate in six games, playing in only 2 games for special teams purposes. On January 11, 2005, he had shoulder surgery.

On August 9, 2005, he suffered a shoulder injury a day after being named the starter at right tackle. On August 13, 2005, he sprained the medial collateral ligament in his left knee and although the team felt he could still play the season with the injury (Mark Tuinei had a similar situation), Rogers decided to have microfracture surgery and be put on the injured reserve list. This disagreement did not sit well with the Cowboys, who made him rehab outside of the team's training facilities and eventually waived him on March 17, 2006.

=== Denver Broncos ===
After a year out of football, he signed with the Denver Broncos as a free agent on January 2, 2007. Rogers was practicing with the first team at right tackle throughout training camp, until suffering another left knee injury. On August 21, he was waived before the season started.

== Personal life ==
Rogers began coaching at the University of Mississippi in 2007, and also coached at Central Connecticut State University in 2008 and 2009. He currently works in a family business in Ventura, California.
