= Cherokee Male Seminary =

Cherokee Nation college opened in 1846

Coordinates: 35°52′02″N 94°57′20″W

The Cherokee Male Seminary was a tribal college established in 1846 by the Cherokee Nation in Indian Territory. Opened in 1851, it was one of the first institutions of higher learning in the United States to be founded west of the Mississippi River.

== Creation ==
After removal to Indian Territory, the Cherokee Nation worked to rebuild its institutions and society. In October 1846, Chief John Ross submitted a proposal to the Cherokee National Council to pass legislation for the creation of institutions of higher learning for both Cherokee men and women. On November 26, 1846, the Council passed a bill stating that, "Whereas, the improvement of the moral and intellectual condition of our people is contemplated by the Constitution, and whereas, we are now in possession of means sufficient to carry out, to a further degree of maturity, the National system of education already commenced."

In a ceremony on October 28, 1847, the first cornerstone of the male seminary, containing books and documents, was laid by Chief Ross.

Before the school opened, representatives from the Cherokee Nation visited New England seeking teachers and recruited faculty from Yale University, Mount Holyoke College, and Newton Theological Seminary. $80,000 of tribal funds was allocated for the construction of Cherokee Male Seminary and the Cherokee Female Seminary.

== 1851–1856 ==
The Cherokee Male Seminary opened its doors to 27 new students on May 6, 1851. The boarding school occupied a three-story red brick building on a campus located southwest of Tahlequah, Indian Territory. Curriculum included English grammar, composition, arithmetic, algebra, elocution, astronomy, botany, economics, geology, geography, history, philosophy, zoology, and language classes in Greek, Latin, French, and German.

To gain admission, prospective students had to pass a two-day examination. The tribe paid for the students' tuition and expenses. By 1856, 13 men graduated from the Male Seminary. New students were not accepted in the fall of 1856. Reopening of the school was delayed until the 1870s due to the effects of the American Civil War.

== 1870s ==
After the war, the school was reopened in the 1870s. Students had to pay for their room and board, and the Cherokee Nation opened enrollment to men from other Native American tribes. At the time "the Cherokee Nation had a better common school system than either Arkansas or Missouri," writes historian Grant Foreman.

== Closing ==
Under the assimilationist Curtis Act of 1898, the US federal government systematically dismantled Cherokee tribal institutions, including the Cherokee Male Seminary. The tribe continued using the school building as a co-educational facility after Oklahoma statehood, but it burnt down in 1910. The last students graduated that year, with commencement ceremonies being held at Northeastern State Normal School. The Cherokee Nation has not operated a tribal college since then.

== Notable alumni ==
- William Wirt Hastings (1866–1938), US Representative
- Joel B. Mayes (1833–1891), Principal Chief of the Cherokee Nation
- Samuel Houston Mayes (1845–1927), Principal Chief of the Cherokee Nation
- J. B. Milam (1884–1949), Principal Chief of the Cherokee Nation
- Clement V. Rogers (1839–1911), Cherokee Nation senator and judge, father of humorist Will Rogers

== Notable staff ==
- Oswald Langdon Woodford (1827-1870)
