= William Charles Rogers =

Cherokee statesman (1847–1917)

William C. Rogers
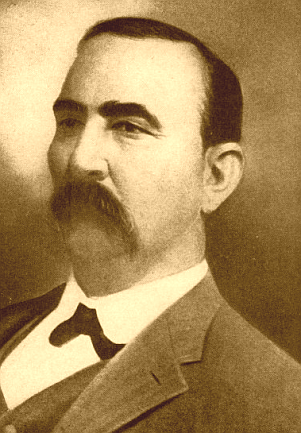

Principal Chief of the Cherokee Nation
- In office 1903–1917
- Preceded by: Thomas Buffington
- Succeeded by: Andrew B. Cunningham

Member of the Cherokee Senate from the Cooweescoowee District
- In office 1889–1903

Member of the Cherokee National Council from the Cooweescoowee District
- In office 1881–1889

Personal details
- Born: December 13, 1847 Cherokee Nation, Indian Territory (now Tulsa County, Oklahoma)
- Died: November 8, 1917 (aged 69) Skiatook, Oklahoma
- Citizenship: Cherokee Nation; American
- Party: Downing Party
- Other political affiliations: Republican

Military service
- Allegiance: Cherokee Nation; Confederate States
- Branch/service: Confederate States Army
- Rank: Private
- Unit: First Regiment of Cherokee Volunteers
- Battles/wars: American Civil War

William Charles Rogers (December 13, 1847 – November 8, 1917) was a Cherokee politician, Confederate veteran and farmer. He served as Principal Chief of Cherokee Nation from 1903 to 1917.

After serving as a representative and a senator in the Cherokee Council, he was elected Principal Chief of the Cherokee Nation in 1903, defeating E. L. Cookson. He served during the final liquidation of the independent Cherokee government by the United States of America and the establishment of the state of Oklahoma in 1906–7. He remained as principal chief, but with greatly diminished powers, performing largely ceremonial functions for the tribe until his death.

== Early life ==
William Charles Rogers was the son of Charles Coody Rogers and Elizabeth McCorkle. After being educated in tribal schools, he decided to become a farmer like his father. He acquired a tract of land about 2 miles (3.2 km) north of present-day Skiatook, Oklahoma, and began his own farm. In 1877, he constructed a general store on his own land on Bird Creek and established the original town of Skiatook.

Rogers enlisted in the Confederate Army on July 12, 1861, and served as a private for the duration of the conflict in Company E in the First Regiment of Cherokee Volunteers. (Note: The regimental colonel was his fellow tribesman, Stand Watie.) After the war, he returned to his farm.

== Political career ==
Rogers began his career in tribal politics when he ran for election as a representative of the Cooweescoowee District of the Cherokee Nation in 1881. His bid succeeded and he won reelection in 1883.In 1889, he ran for the tribal senate from the same district, and was reelected in 1889. In 1903, the so-called "Downing Party" (Note: The Downing Party was named for a post Civil War Principal Chief, Lewis Downing.) chose him as their candidate as principal chief to replace Chief Thomas Buffington. He was opposed by E. L. Cookson, the candidate of the National Party. (Note: The National Party was founded by long-time Principal Chief John Ross.) He was elected as the last principal chief elected under the Cherokee Nation. (Note: In 1902, Congress had selected July 4, 1906 as the date on which Tribal Governments would expire, being replaced by the U. S. Government.)

At the final session of the Cherokee Council on November 9, 1904, he delivered the following message:

But a crisis in our affairs is at hand. The Government which our forefathers cherished and loved and labored so hard to perfect, has been sentenced to die. The scepter must soon pass to other hands. Still, we must force back the resentment we feel and accept the conditions as they are. The decrees of fate are inexorable. Representative bodies are usually brought together to organize or maintain a government; seldom indeed is the spectacle afforded of such a body of men calmly assembled together to prepare for its own dissolution and yet your coming together is largely for that purpose. The importance of this melancholy fact must not be underestimated or approached in a spirit of indifference. The best service of which you are capable is the demand of the hour and painstaking effort should characterize your every act so that the result may redound to the everlasting credit and benefit of our people.

Chief Rogers declined to call an election for members of the National Council in 1905. The decisions affecting the termination of the Cherokee Nation government had been made, and Rogers felt there was insufficient work remaining that would justify the cost of an election. Nevertheless, an election was held without his approval. The newly elected members remove Rogers as chief, replacing him with Frank J. Boudinot. Meanwhile, the U.S. Congress had made the Secretary of the Interior responsible for concluding the work of the Dawes Commission. The Secretary designated Rogers as the rightful chief to sign documents for the tribe. He remained in this semi-official position until 1917.

Rogers married Nannie Haynie on February 15, 1892, in Kansas City.

After his four-year term of office was complete, he retained the status of chief, for purposes of dealing with matters of the handover of power to the United States.

Rogers was a Freemason and was buried in Hillside Mission Cemetery, about 3.5 miles (5.6 km) north of Skiatook, Oklahoma.

== Sources ==
Chronicles of Oklahoma, Volume 17, No. 2; June, 1939; by John Bartlett Meserve.

Preceded by Thomas Buffington	Principal Chief of the Cherokee Nation; 1903–1907 (extended to his death in 1917)	Succeeded by J. B. Milam
