= Adair Park (Stilwell, Oklahoma) =

Recreational site in Oklahoma, United States

- Location within Oklahoma
- Location: Adair County, Oklahoma, United States
- Nearest city: Stilwell, OK
- Coordinates: 35.831237°N 94.625021°W
- Area: 25 acres (10 ha)
- Governing body: Adair County
- Website: www.travelok.com/listings/view.profile/id.12705

Adair Park, formerly named Adair State Park, is located in the city of Stilwell, Oklahoma in Adair County, Oklahoma., adjacent to the Adair County fairgrounds. The 25-acre (100,000 m^{2}) park offers 7 RV campsites and 20 primitive campsites, as well as a fishing pond, playground, comfort station with showers, covered shelters and picnic facilities. The park also contains a fishing pond that covers 15-acre (61,000 m^{2}). Fishing is allowed from the shore of the pond.

The state of Oklahoma announced in 2011 that it would close this park as a budget-cutting measure. Rather than closing, on September 15, 2011, Adair County assumed management of the park. It is now formally known as Adair Park.
