= Oswald Langdon Woodford =

American politician (1827–1870)

Oswald Langdon Woodford (October 31, 1827 – October 21, 1870) was an American minister, teacher, and politician.

Woodford was the son of Zerah and Minerva (Potter) Woodford, born on October 31, 1827. He was a teacher for two years in the Cherokee Male Seminary, and then entered the Andover Theological Seminary. He returned to the Cherokees, and was principal of the Male Seminary until August 1856. He then came to New Haven, to attend Theological lectures, and in May 1857, went to Kansas as a Home Missionary. He settled in Grasshopper Falls, organizing a Congregational Church in 1858, however in 1859, he returned to his native town due to his health. He spent his remaining years with his parents, engaged in farming. In 1865 he was a member of the Connecticut State House of Representatives. In 1870, he died in West Avon of typhoid fever.

He was married, first, to Pauline Avery in 1856. She died in Kansas in 1858. He again married in May 1859 to Esther Butler.

This article incorporates public domain material from the Yale Obituary Record.
