= Helen Gordon (businesswoman) =

British business executive (born 1959)

Dame Helen Gordon DBE
- Born: May 1959
- Education: Sale Girls' Grammar School; Oxford Brookes University (BSc, estate management)
- Occupations: Property executive; Chartered surveyor
- Employer: Grainger plc
- Title: Chief executive officer
- Term: 3 November 2015–present
- Predecessor: Andrew Cunningham
- Board member of: Derwent London (non-executive director); British Property Federation (president, 2019–2020)

Dame Helen Gordon DBE (born May 1959) is a British business executive who is the chief executive of the FTSE 250 Index listed company Grainger plc.

Gordon is a board member of the New Covent Garden Market Authority and an Advisory Board member of Cambridge University Land Economy Department. she was a Trustee of the College of Estate Management for nine years.

== Early life and education ==
Gordon was educated at Sale Girls' Grammar School and studied estate management at Oxford Polytechnic (now Oxford Brookes University).

== Career ==
=== Early career ===
Gordon worked in development and real estate roles early in her career, including on the development of Milton Keynes, and later held senior posts at John Laing and Railtrack. She subsequently spent more than a decade at Legal & General Investment Management and later joined the Royal Bank of Scotland, where she led real estate asset management activities prior to moving to Grainger.

=== Grainger plc ===
Grainger announced Gordon’s appointment as CEO designate in June 2015. The company subsequently said she would join no later than 1 December 2015 (earlier than initially indicated). Grainger later reported that Gordon was appointed as chief executive officer on 3 November 2015 and that Andrew Cunningham retired from the board in January 2016.

Reporting on Grainger’s strategy, the Evening Standard described Gordon as pursuing a simplification of the business and a focus on the build-to-rent sector soon after taking up the role.

== Other roles and appointments ==
She was reappointed as a board member of the New Covent Garden Market Authority in 2013.
