= Andrew Cunningham Farm =

- U.S. National Register of Historic Places
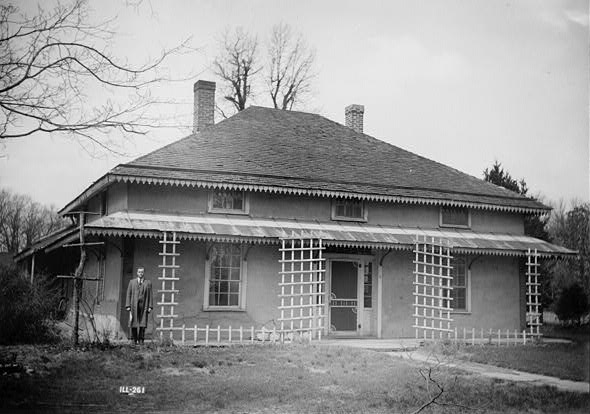
- The Andrew Cunningham Farm in 1936.

- Location within Illinois Location within the United States
- Location: Cass County, Illinois, USA
- Nearest city: Virginia
- Coordinates: 39°56′56″N 90°12′42″W
- Area: 2 acres (0.81 ha)
- Built: 1852
- NRHP reference No.: 75000641
- Added to NRHP: May 12, 1975

The Andrew Cunningham Farm is located near the Cass County, Illinois city of Virginia. The Cunningham Farm is listed on the National Register of Historic Places, one of only two such sites in Cass County. The other site, in Beardstown, is the Beardstown Grand Opera House. The farm is about two and a half miles east of Virginia. It has been listed on the Register since May 12, 1975.

== History ==
The home, called Allandale or Allendale, was constructed in 1852 by Andrew Cunningham.
