= California Strawberry Festival =

Annual festival in Ventura, California, US

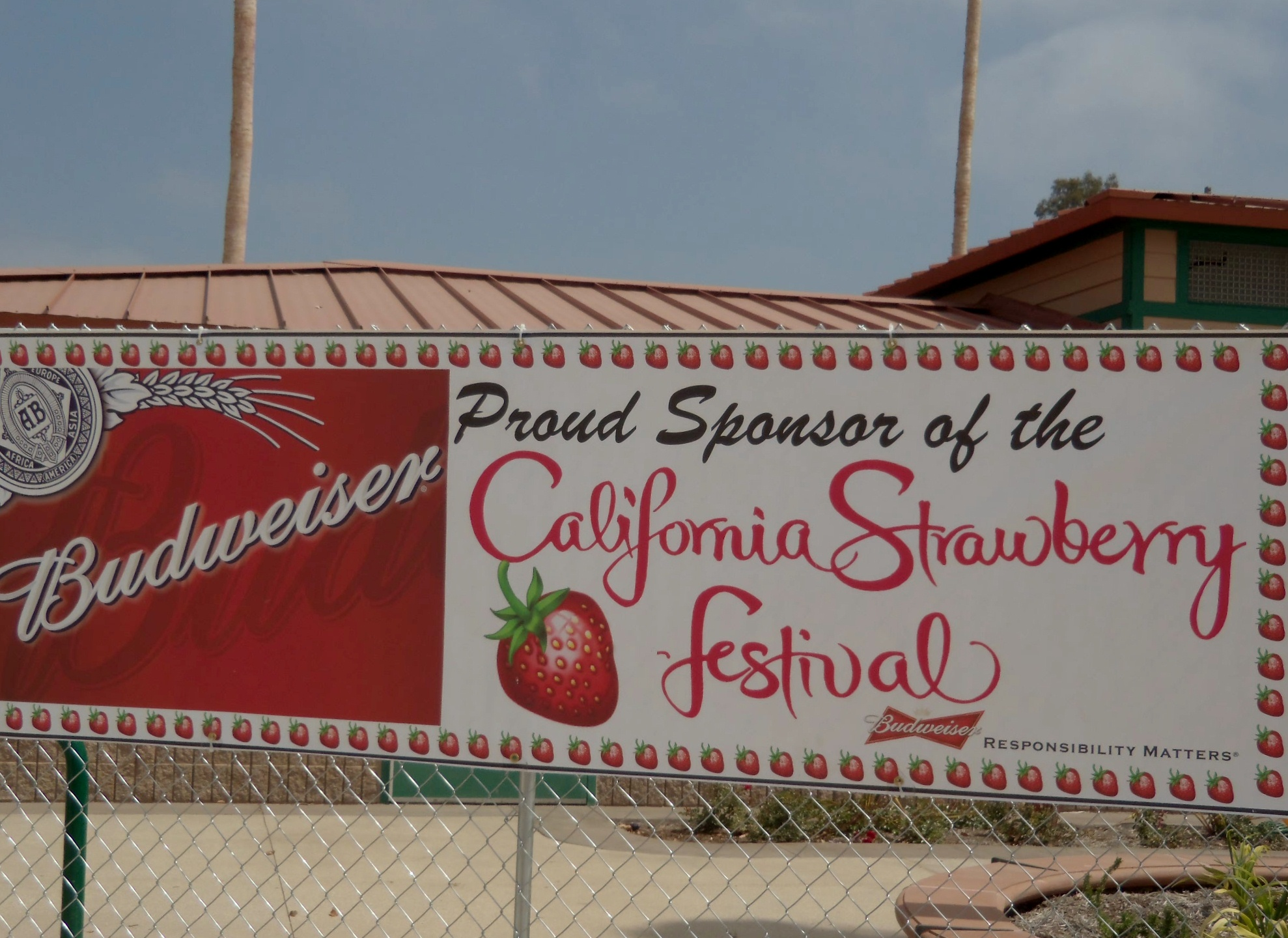
- Sign with logo at College Park in 2012
- Status: Active
- Genre: Festival
- Frequency: Annual
- Venue: Ventura County Fairgrounds
- Location: Ventura, California
- Coordinates: 34°16′31″N 119°18′13″W
- Country: United States
- Years active: 1984–2019; 2023-present
- Inaugurated: 1984
- Attendance: 50,000
- Area: 50 acres (20 ha)
- Leader: Dean Kato
- Patrons: The J.M. Smucker Company; Budweiser
- Website: California Strawberry Festival

The California Strawberry Festival is a two-day annual strawberry festival that takes place in Ventura County, California on the third weekend of May. The event was initiated in 1984 at Channel Islands Harbor in Oxnard before it began its 28-year run at College Park, finally moving to its current location at the Ventura County Fairgrounds in Ventura.

The festival is set up as a nonprofit organization, which is supported by local businesses and growers who work in California's strawberry cultivation economy. It features an array of strawberry menu items, along with other food vendors, carnival rides, musical entertainment, pie-eating contests and an arts and crafts market.

== Background and history ==
Strawberries constitute an important part of California's agricultural economy. As of 1998, they were grown on 7,500 acres (3,000 ha) in Ventura County alone—bringing in $176 million—making it the county's second-largest crop after lemons.

In 1983, councilman and former mayor of the city of Oxnard—Tsujio Kato—was asked by public relations consultant Terry Pimsleur if there would be any interest in creating a strawberry festival there. Strawberries were very important to Kato, whose uncle was the most significant grower of strawberries in the area at the time. The city council voted to approve the festival and provided the funds, making it a city-sponsored event. Kato and Pimsleur, along with city staff members Kathy Burris and Jim Faulconer, worked together to organize the festival and create a logo. They called it the California Strawberry Festival, to emphasize the state's growing reputation in strawberry cultivation. Kato recruited board members throughout the city for their advice and expertise. Then-director Shelley Merrick explained that one of the rationales for starting the festival was to pay homage to harvest festivals of the past.

The festival made its first appearance at Channel Islands Harbor in 1984, drawing 5,000 visitors. The participation of local businesses, growers, and industries was a big factor in the festival's success, especially The J.M. Smucker Company, the event's first-ever patron. Budweiser later came on as a sponsor, at times sending in their Clydesdales for promotion. The income from the festival helped thirty nonprofit organizations that year. In 1991 the festival moved from Channel Islands Harbor to Strawberry Meadows at College Park to give the rising number of visitors more space to enjoy all the activities that it had to offer. Free parking was available at a number of fields surrounding the venue, and hay bales were substituted for seating.

The festival was registered in the Library of Congress in 2000 as an integral part of its American Folklife Center. The next year, the festival changed into a public benefit, nonprofit organization with a board of directors composed solely of volunteers. One of its goals was to create a revenue stream to ensure that the following year's festival would be successful, and to provide the community with funds to support local nonprofit organizations. Around half of the festival's food booths were run by nonprofits such as the Rotary Club and the Boys & Girls Club of Camarillo. In 2003, the Buena High School music department received $27,000 from the festival for things like band uniforms and instrument maintenance. The organization provided $5,000 in scholarships to students of California State University, Channel Islands who were strawberry pickers or the children of farm workers.

Shuttle bus service to the festival was provided from the Oxnard Transportation Center. The shuttle program was expanded in 2004 to 18 buses, which added more stops in town and in nearby Camarillo, reducing the number of cars on major arteries in the park's vicinity. The festival's final iteration at College Park took place in 2019, after which the event was cancelled for three years due to the COVID-19 pandemic. The festival restarted in 2023 at its new location at the Ventura County Fairgrounds in Ventura.

== Description ==
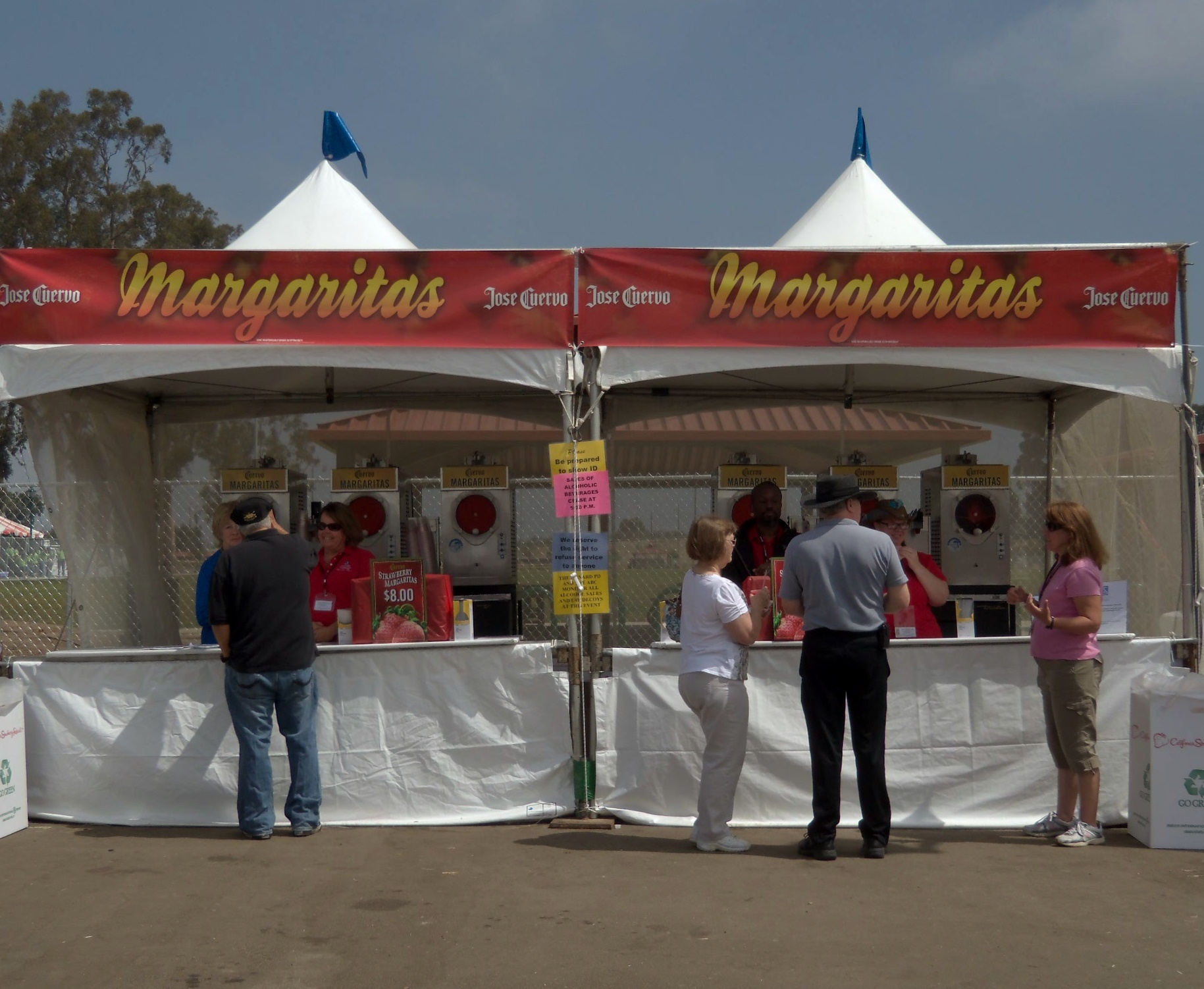
Food booth offering strawberry margaritas at the festival in 2012

The two-day festival is held annually at the Ventura County Fairgrounds on the third weekend of May. It occupies 50 acres (20 ha) of the property and draws 20,000 to 25,000 visitors each day. A 2003 survey conducted at the festival found that 66 percent of attendees arrived from beyond Ventura County, and almost half from Southern California. Some came from U.S. states as far away as Delaware and South Carolina, and three foreign countries. Out of other events in Southern California, only the Old Spanish Days Fiesta and the Santa Barbara Summer Solstice Parade had higher visitor counts, at 100,000 each.

The festival has 40 different food vendors, along with carnival rides, pie-eating contests and other activities for all ages. The annual Strawberry Recipe Contest awarded winners with festival tickets, posters, T-shirts and wine glasses. Around 200 crafters and artists throughout the United States show their original works with a wide range of mediums including paintings, sculptures, ceramics, toys, accessories, photographs, textiles, furniture, jewelry, and foods—especially strawberry-related fare. Some of these included strawberry popcorn, strawberry chimichangas, strawberry tamales, deep-fried strawberries, berry kabobs, strawberry bread, strawberry pizza, strawberry shortcake, strawberry nachos, strawberry funnel cake, chocolate dipped strawberries, strawberry smoothies, strawberry margaritas and strawberry beer. In addition to the strawberry menu items, a wide variety of ethnic food is served at the festival, and also alcohol. Although ATMs are placed throughout the festival, cash cannot be used for payment at booths that serve alcohol.

An array of music artists have performed live at the festival, including Colin Hay, Christopher Cross, Drew Dolan, Smooth Sounds of Santana, Surf City Allstars, Past Action Heroes, Los So Lows, Petty or Not, Tabu, Upstream, and Twisted Gypsy. Children watch puppet and magic shows at the Family Fun Stage. The Berry Baby Fashion Show is an event where infants up to four years of age participate in a fashion parade. Others include the Ninja Nation Obstacle Course and an annual artwork contest. Carnival rides include the Train, Red Baron, Eagle 16 Ferris Wheel, Motor Cycles, Bear Affair, Kiddy Swing, and Winky the Whale.

== See also ==
- Florida Strawberry Festival
- National Strawberry Festival
- List of strawberry topics
