= North Canton Community United Methodist Church =

Church in North Canton, Connecticut, USA

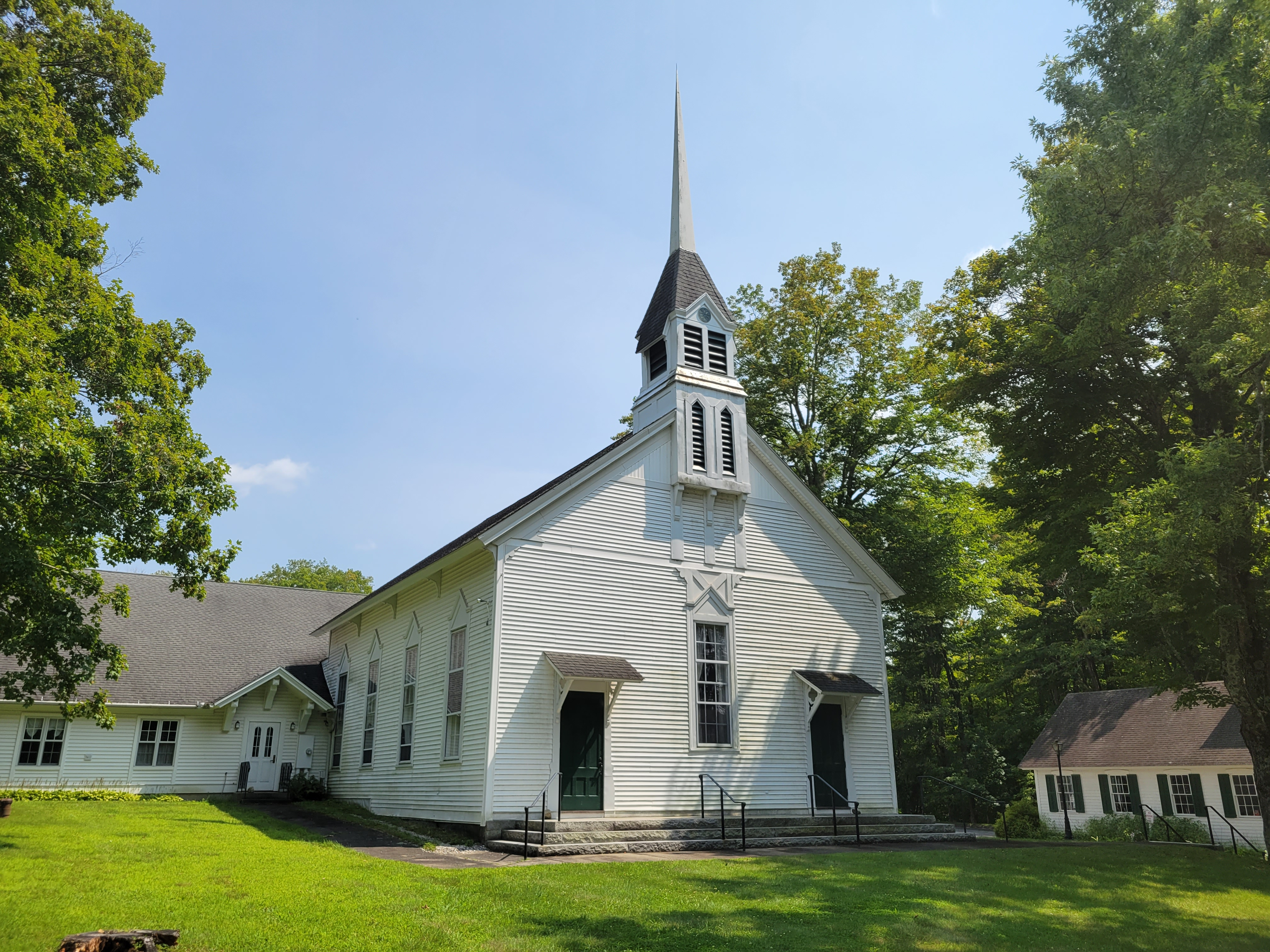
- North Canton Community United Methodist Church
- 41.8993°N 72.8917°W
- Location: North Canton, Connecticut
- Denomination: United Methodist
- Website: http://www.northcantonumc.org/

History
- Founded: 1871

Administration
- Division: New York Annual Conference

Clergy
- Pastor: Gene Ott

The North Canton Community United Methodist Church is a historic church in North Canton, Connecticut. It was founded in 1871 at the intersection of Cherry Brook Road (Route 179) and Case Street on land donated by Milo Lee and Ruggles Case. The first service was held April 12, 1872. An adjacent parsonage was purchased from Milo Lee in 1875. The church is a member of the New York Annual Conference of the United Methodist Church.

The church has hosted an annual Strawberry Festival every June since 1951, with the exception of two years (2020, 2021) during the COVID epidemic.

== Cemetery ==
The North Canton Cemetery, originally known as North Burying Ground, is located on Route 179 (Cherry Brook Rd) in North Canton. The land was a gift from Peter Curtiss of Canton (then called West Simsbury), circa 1744, with the first burial taking place in 1756. Many of the church's members sit on the Board & are caretakers of the cemetery. There are also a few burials in the North Canton Community UMC's Memorial Garden which is located behind the church.
