= Grainger plc =

British residential property firm

- Type: Public
- Traded as: LSE: GRI; FTSE 250 component
- Industry: Property
- Founded: 1912
- Headquarters: Newcastle upon Tyne, UK
- Key people: Mark Clare, (chairman); Helen Gordon, (CEO)
- Products: Private rented sector Build-to-rent Regulated tenancies
- Revenue: ▼£261.0 million (2026)
- Operating income: ▼£118.8 million (2026)
- Net income: ▼£(36.6) million (2026)
- Website: www.graingerplc.co.uk

Grainger plc is a British-based residential property business. It is headquartered in Newcastle upon Tyne and is a constituent of the FTSE 250 Index.

== History ==
The business was established by the Dickinson family in 1912 as the Grainger Trust to acquire tenanted residential properties in Newcastle upon Tyne. In the 1970s and 1980s it acquired large residential estates from British Coal, British Rail and Reckitt & Colman. It was first listed on the London Stock Exchange in 1983. In 1989 it acquired Channel Hotels & Properties and in 2003 it acquired Bradford Property Trust.

From 1987 to 2002, Quentin Wallop, 10th Earl of Portsmouth, was a non-executive director, and as of 1999 he owned 16.55% of the equity, making him the largest shareholder of the company.

In 2006 Grainger entered into a joint venture with Development Securities to develop Curzon Park in Birmingham. In 2007 it changed its name to Grainger plc. In 2008 a consortium of Helical Bar and Grainger was named as the preferred developer for the King Street regeneration scheme in Hammersmith. In 2010, Grainger acquired AIM-listed Sovereign Reversions, an equity release provider, and subsequently formed a 50:50 joint venture with Moorfield, a UK real estate investor, developer and private equity fund manager.

In 2011 the company entered into a development agreement with the Defence Infrastructure Organisation to create the Wellesley Development, which incorporates the Cambridge Military Hospital at Aldershot and which will generate 3,850 homes. In 2019, Grainger was announced as the build-to-rent partner of Transport for London (TfL), which will build new homes on land in TfL's ownership, potentially delivering in excess of 3,000 homes across London.

== Operations ==
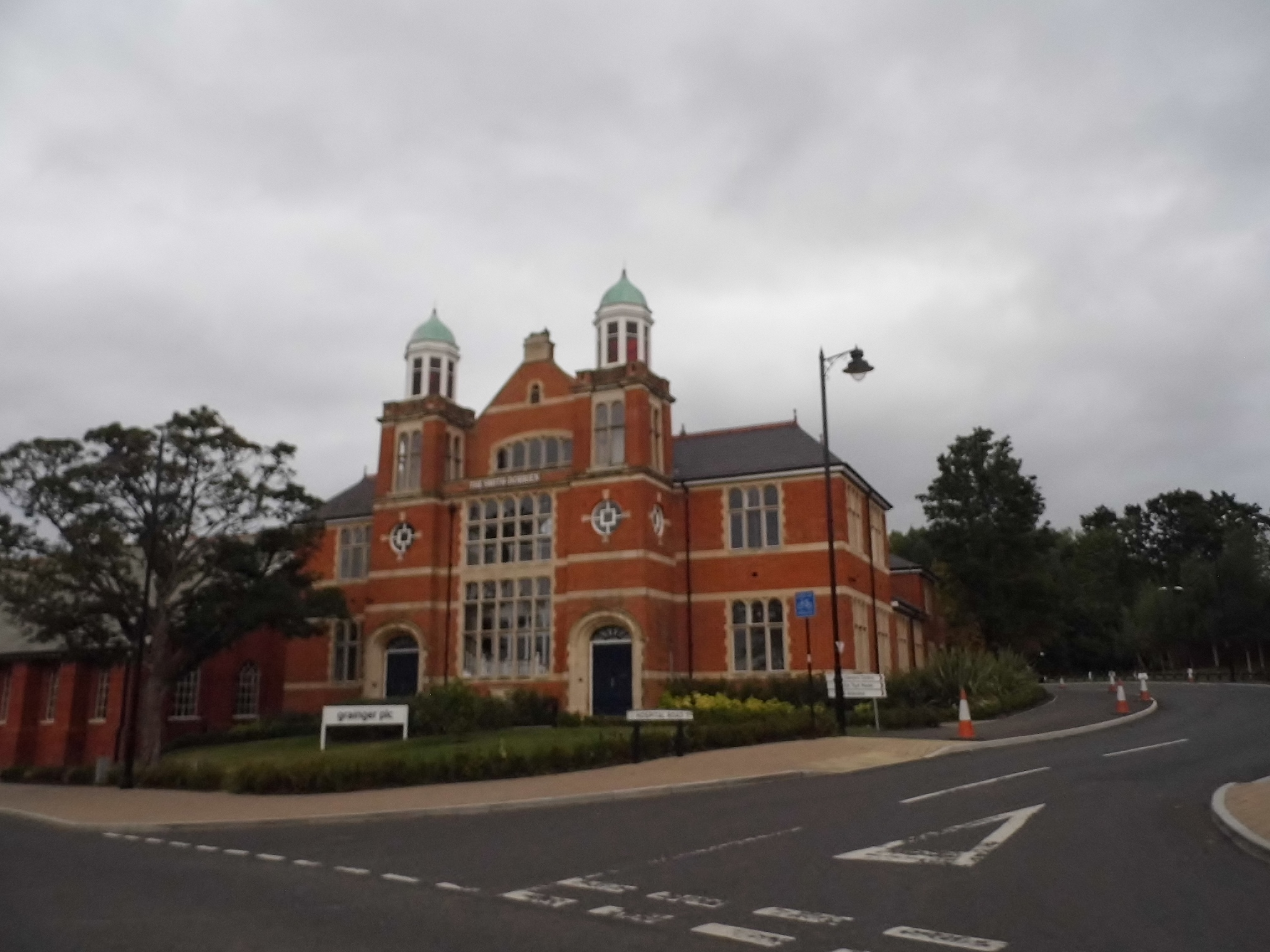
Smith-Dorrien House in Aldershot, built in 1908 as an entertainment centre for soldiers and which Grainger now uses as offices for the Wellesley project, a major residential development by Grainger plc

As at 30 September 2026 the company's investment portfolio was valued at £2.9 billion.
