= Murder of Andrew Cunningham =

2008 murder case in the United Kingdom

On 10 December 2008, Andrew Cunningham was found murdered in his caravan in Riverside Road, Earlsfield, in the London Borough of Wandsworth. Cunningham, a 52-year-old convicted sex offender, was stabbed to death in an attack described as "frenzied" by Deputy Coroner Dr. Shirley Radcliffe and "sadistic" by Detective Inspector Alison Hepworth of the Homicide and Major Crime Command.

The crime remains unsolved and the Metropolitan Police offer a reward of £20,000 for information leading to the identification, arrest and prosecution of those responsible.

== Background ==
Cunningham, a father of five, was imprisoned in 2001 for unlawful sex with a 15-year-old girl. At the time of his murder, he was working as a lorry driver and was living in a caravan outside the haulage company he worked for.

== Murder ==
Police believe Cunningham let his killer into his caravan as there was no sign of forced entry or a struggle. Cunningham was repeatedly stabbed in the chest, throat and neck. His body was found naked with his genitals mutilated. £6,000 in cash was stolen from the caravan.

Police have identified a revenge vigilante killing as the most likely motive whilst not ruling out a robbery with the possibility the genital mutilation was a ruse.

The murder took place less than 50 metres from The Corner Pin public house on a night with a Champions League football match and a short distance from a greyhound track that was host to a race that evening. Despite that all witnesses interviewed by police reported having seen or heard no suspicious activity. This led to suggestions in The Independent that the crime was "the murder nobody wants to help solve". Detective Chief Inspector Nick Scola told the paper that "There may be people who know something but are refusing to tell us, and are using Mr Cunningham's background, the paedophile tag, to justify it to themselves". Detective Chief Inspector Scola also stated that "...even in a situation like this...taking someone's life is wrong, regardless of that person's background. I would also remind people that there is a killer still out there and a killer is a killer no matter which way you look at it."

== Coroner's inquest ==
In November 2012, Dr Shirley Radcliffe, sitting at the Westminster Coroner's Court, ruled that Cunningham had been unlawfully killed. The inquest heard that despite interviewing 800 people police had failed to locate his killers. The court also heard allegations that Cunningham had been seen with three underage girls the day prior to his murder. Rumours had also been spread in the area that Cunningham had sexually assaulted a two-year-old girl, which police found no evidence to support.

Cunningham's sister told the inquest the area in which Cunningham was murdered was "swamped" with CCTV and she was "dubious as to why they were switched off."
