= Johnson Harris =

Cherokee leader (1856–1921)

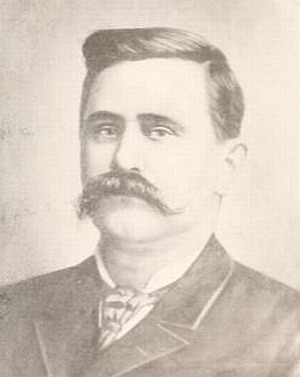
Chief C. J. Harris.

Colonel Johnson Harris (April 19, 1856 – 1921) was a native American politician. His father was of Euro-American descent and his mother was Cherokee. Harris' public life began with his election to the Cherokee senate in 1881. On the death of J. B. Mayes, he was appointed by council as Principal Chief of the Cherokee Nation in Indian Territory, from 1891 to 1895.

Political offices
Preceded by Joel B. Mayes	Principal Chief of the Cherokee Nation; 1891–1895	Succeeded by Samuel Houston Mayes
