= Andrew B. Cunningham (Cherokee chief) =

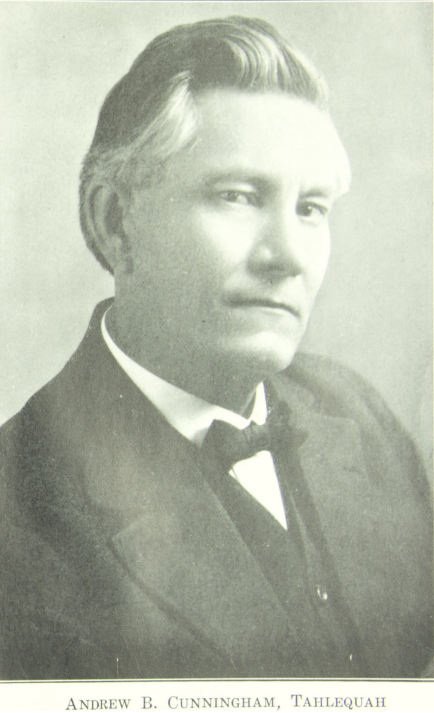

Principal Chief of the Cherokee Nation
- In office 1917–1928
- Appointed by: Franklin Knight Lane
- Preceded by: William C. Rogers
- Succeeded by: Charles J. Hunt

Mayor of Tahlequah, Oklahoma
- In office 1921–1927
- Preceded by: J. W. Reid
- Succeeded by: A. T. Edmondson
- In office 1901–1904
- Preceded by: G. W. Burge
- Succeeded by: A. S. Wyly

Personal details
- Born: May 1, 1869 Delaware District, Cherokee Nation
- Died: September 12, 1928 (aged 59) Tahlequah, Oklahoma, United States
- Citizenship: Cherokee Nation; American (after 1907)

Andrew B. Cunningham (May 1, 1869 – September 12, 1928) was a Cherokee politician who served as the appointed Principal Chief of the Cherokee Nation from 1917 to 1928. He was also the Mayor of Tahlequah from 1901 to 1904 and 1921 to 1927.

== Biography ==
Andrew B. Cunningham was born on May 1, 1869, in the Delaware District of the Cherokee Nation. He attended the nation's public schools in Vinita and moved to Tahlequah after graduation. He served as an executive secretary to Thomas Buffington and William C. Rogers. After Rogers' death in 1917, U.S. Secretary of Interior Franklin Knight Lane appointed him as the acting principal chief. He served in that role until his death on September 12, 1928. He also served as the mayor of Tahlequah from 1901 to 1904 and 1921 to 1927.
