= Bismarck Lepe =

American businessman

Bismarck C Lepe
- Born: Accra
- Occupation: Founder of Wizeline
- Website: Wizeline

Bismarck Lepe is an information technology CEO and product manager. Lepe is the founder of Wizeline.

Prior to founding Ooyala with Sean Knapp (CTO) and Belsasar Lepe (Director of Engineering), Lepe worked at Google as a Senior Product Manager responsible for the development and launch of monetization products for the Google AdSense network. While at Google, Bismarck launched over 25 different products focused on search and content monetization that contributed over $1 billion in annual revenue. Lepe directly led the display and video advertising efforts for the AdSense network.

At Ooyala, Lepe was CEO and President of Product from inception in 2007 until August 2009. As CEO, he raised over $10M of funding, developed the strategic vision of the company and signed many of the early media partnerships. In the role of President of Product Strategy, Lepe was responsible for all product and corporate marketing functions and was leading the team focused on developing new monetization technologies for media companies.

== Background ==
Lepe also sits on the Ooyala Board of Directors and is a graduate of Stanford University. He is a Mexican-American. His parents are from Juchitlán, Jalisco, Mexico who moved to the United States in 1979 as migrant agricultural workers who would take Bismarck back and forth to Mexico until he was 5 years old. Lepe speaks fluent Mexican Spanish. His uncle was a doctor in Manzanillo, Mexico. He went to public school in Southern California.

== Sources ==
- Where does Google go next? by Adam Lashinsky, May 12, 2008.
- Close to the Vest by Quentin Hardy, July 2, 2007.
