= The Cane as a Weapon =

1912 book by Andrew Chase Cunningham

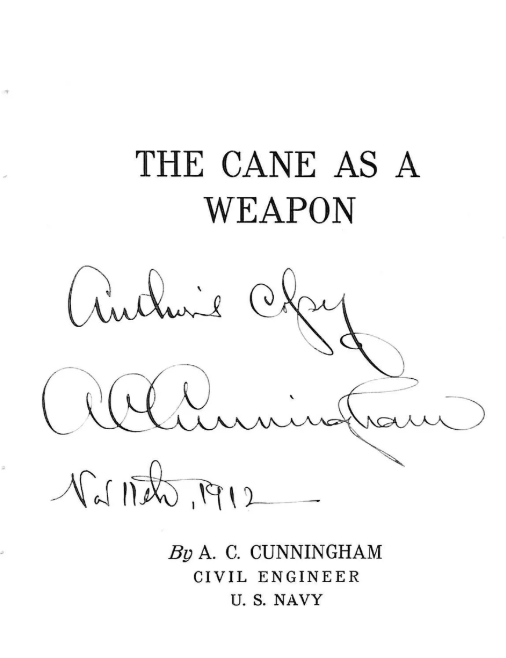
- Title page for The Cane as a Weapon (1912), this edition shows signature of the author as well.
- Author: Andrew Chase Cunningham
- Language: English
- Genre: Non-fiction
- Publication date: 1912
- Publication place: United States

The Cane as a Weapon is a book by Andrew Chase Cunningham presenting a concise system of self defense making use of a walking stick or umbrella. It was first published in 1912 in the United States.

== Background ==
Andrew Chase Cunningham was born in New York. He attended the United States Naval Academy from 1874 through 1881, during which time he served aboard the U.S.S. Shenandoah. After graduating, he was assigned to the training ship U.S.S. Saratoga and continued to serve in the United States Navy until he resigned in 1884. He would later rejoin the Navy in 1898 as a civil engineer, and was granted the relative rank of Lieutenant. In 1903 he was assigned to the United States Naval Academy, where he remained for two years until 1905. He would subsequently serve at the Bureau of Yards and Docks as well as the Norfolk Navy Yard. Cunningham would continue to work for the Norfolk Navy Yard until 1913, when he was assigned to the Portsmouth Navy Yard. His final assignment was for the radio station at Point Isabel, Texas in 1915, a position he held until he was placed on sick leave in 1916. Andrew Chase Cunningham would die a year later on January 13 in Washington, D.C., with the relative rank of Lieutenant Commander.

A participant in the sport of fencing, he was the president of the Washington, D.C. Fencing Organization and in 1906 he wrote a Naval drill manual entitled Sabre and Bayonet. In April 1912, Cunningham directed a large fencing tournament, featuring competitors from throughout New York City, Boston and Washington, D.C.. Cunningham's fencing scrapbook of his time serving at the United States Naval Academy is currently held in the academy's archival collections.

Cunningham was made an associate member of the American Society of Civil Engineers in 1891 and on October 3, 1894, was made a full member.

== The Cunningham System ==
The Cane as a Weapon, Cunningham’s second book, consisted of eighteen pages of text and twelve photographs. It is thought to be the only self-defense manual of its type to be produced in the United States during this period.

Although several European authors had previously produced books and articles on the subject of self-defense with a walking cane, the Cunningham cane defense system was unique in several respects.

Of the three basic guard positions that he advocates, two involve holding the cane with the tip pointed towards the ground. These positions have the advantage of appearing to be non-threatening and also make it difficult for an opponent to seize the defender’s weapon, unlike the more orthodox, fencing-based guards advocated by some other writers. They also serve as positions of invitation, exposing the defender’s head and torso to attack while providing the opportunity to counter such attacks with powerful, upward-sweeping parries.

The third basic guard position, which Cunningham refers to as the double-handed guard, was also featured in several previous works on cane defense. However, his system places an unusual emphasis upon this type of guard, stressing the augmented strength of attacks and defenses and the possibility of quick, snapping attacks and parries to be executed with either hand. Cunningham's advocacy of this position might have been due to his previous experience at bayonet fencing. The double-handed guard also facilitates powerful close-range jabs and "bar strikes" with the portion of the cane held between the defender’s hands.

The author pays special attention to the various different types of counter-attacks, defining the action of performing a cut or strike according to the direction, height, target and "character" of the action. The latter are defined as snap, half-arm, full-arm or swinging cuts. He also distinguishes between two types of "stabbing" blow with the cane, the jab and the thrust.

The Cunningham system is ambidextrous and the cane is frequently passed from hand to hand during the defensive sequences that are described and illustrated in the book. Defenses are generally in the form of counter-attacks to the assailant's weapon or to the weapon-wielding hand and targets for counter-attack include the head, throat, midsection, hands, elbows, knees and shins. Instructions are offered for self-defense against multiple opponents, grappling and boxing attacks as well as against attackers armed with knives and sticks.

The book also includes a series of thirty-seven written descriptions of defensive exercises.

== Publication history ==
The Cane as a Weapon was first published on or around 1912 in the United States; some works that mention the book list release dates as late as 1914. The book was put out by The Army & Navy Publishing Company, which continued to publish the book after Cunningham's death.

In 2006, an expanded edition was published through lulu.com.

== Reception ==
The Saskatoon Daily Star reviewed the book, stating that "personally, I am inclined to the belief that if the attacking party shows ability with his fists, it would be well to drop the cane and run like the divil."

== See also ==
- Bartitsu, a British (and Asian-influenced) approach to use of canes and walking sticks as weapons
