= Ooyala =

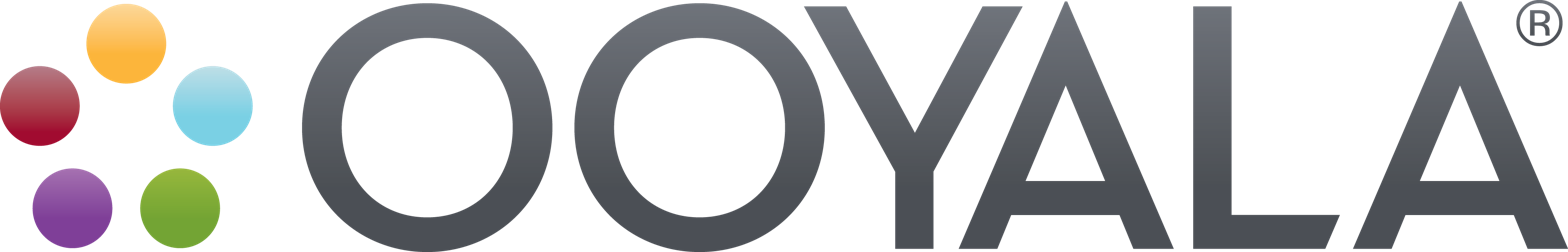
- Type: Subsidiary
- Industry: Media & Entertainment technology and services
- Founded: 2007, Silicon Valley, California
- Founder: Bismarck Lepe; Belsasar Lepe; Sean Knapp
- Defunct: July 19, 2019; 7 years ago
- Fate: Acquired And Dissolved By Dalet; Sold To Brightcove
- Area served: Worldwide
- Number of employees: 500
- Parent: Dalet
- Website: ooyala.tv

Ooyala (pronounced /uːˈjɑːlə/ "oo-YAH-la") was a privately owned company focusing on video content workflow management systems. It began in 2007 as a venture-backed, privately held company founded by brothers Bismarck Lepe and Belsasar Lepe, and their colleague and friend from Google, Sean Knapp. It was acquired by Australian telecom giant Telstra in 2012, which sold it to Ooyala management in October 2018 writing off all its investment. In Feb 2019 Ooyala sold its OVP business to Brightcove.

In July 2019, Dalet, a provider of solutions and services for broadcasters and content professionals, acquired the Ooyala Flex Media Platform business. The asset deal included the Ooyala Flex Media Platform and brand, as well as Ooyala personnel across sales, marketing, engineering, professional services, and support.

The word ooyala means 'cradle' or 'swing' in Kannada or Telugu (ఊయల).

== Early history ==
In January 2007, Bismarck Lepe was working for Google. While developing new monetization techniques for YouTube, he came up with the idea of using computer vision techniques to deliver targeted advertising on TV shows recorded on TiVo. He contacted his brother Belasar and a friend, Sean Knapp, to discuss his idea.

In its first round of funding, Ooyala raised money from a number of angel investors and businesspeople, including Scott Flanders, CEO of Playboy Enterprises; Tim Koogle, Former CEO of Yahoo!; and Oliver Grace, Kip Hagopian, Fred Warren, and Ron Conway. Eight months later, Ooyala raised an additional $8.5 million from Sierra Ventures.

By August 2009, Ooyala was providing video technology and services for over 500 companies under the direction of new CEO Jay Fulcher, formerly of Agile, PeopleSoft, and SAP.

Two more rounds of fund-raising followed in 2010 and 2011. Ooyala had raised $42 million from Sage Venture Partners, Sierra Ventures, Rembrandt Ventures, CID Group (a Shanghai-based private equity fund), Hitochu and Panasonic.

In April 2019, the Online Video Platform business was sold to Brightcove. Ooyala focused all its business and GTM strategy on further growing the Ooyala Flex Media Platform, a content supply chain solution.

In July 2019, the Ooyala Flex Media Platform was acquired by Dalet.

== Telstra subsidiary ==
In June 2012, Telstra led a $35 million (USD) round of financing in Ooyala, and took a 5 percent stake in the company. It announced plans to use Ooyala’s software and services to deliver its television content online and, further, to resell it to other media companies and corporations. It invested a further $26m over intervening years before announcing on 1 October 2014 that it had acquired Ooyala with 98per cent ownership in a deal valued at $270m.

Under Telstra, Ooyala acquired European adtech provider, Videoplaza in 2014 and logistics and workflow software vendor, Nativ in 2015.

In 2016 Telstra wrote down the value of the company by $246m reflecting poor performance of the advertising technology part of the business. In February 2018 Telstra wrote down the rest of the value of the company, taking a $273m impairment, and pulled it from the advertising technology area to focus on its ongoing video platform and media logistics system.

In October 2018 Telstra sold video-streaming platform Ooyala the platform back to Ooyala management. Telstra originally acquired Ooyala for more than $500 million in 2012 and subsequently wrote down to a value of zero in February 2018.

== Products ==
Ooyala initially focused on applying computer vision techniques to create clickable video. As the company grew, it expanded its scope to develop technologies that improve the quality and speed at which online video is delivered, and allow Web publishers to measure, monetize and optimize their video content. Its online video platform enables Web sites to publish, manage, monetize, and analyze online video content. It is built to be modular and provides real-time analysis capability to its customers. Its workflow management system is called Flex media logistics.

In 2010, the company deployed one of the first large-scale Cassandra clusters for its analytics and video transcoding services.
