= Stilwell, Oklahoma =

City in Oklahoma, US

Stilwell, Oklahoma ᏍᏗᎳᏪᎵ (Cherokee)
- City
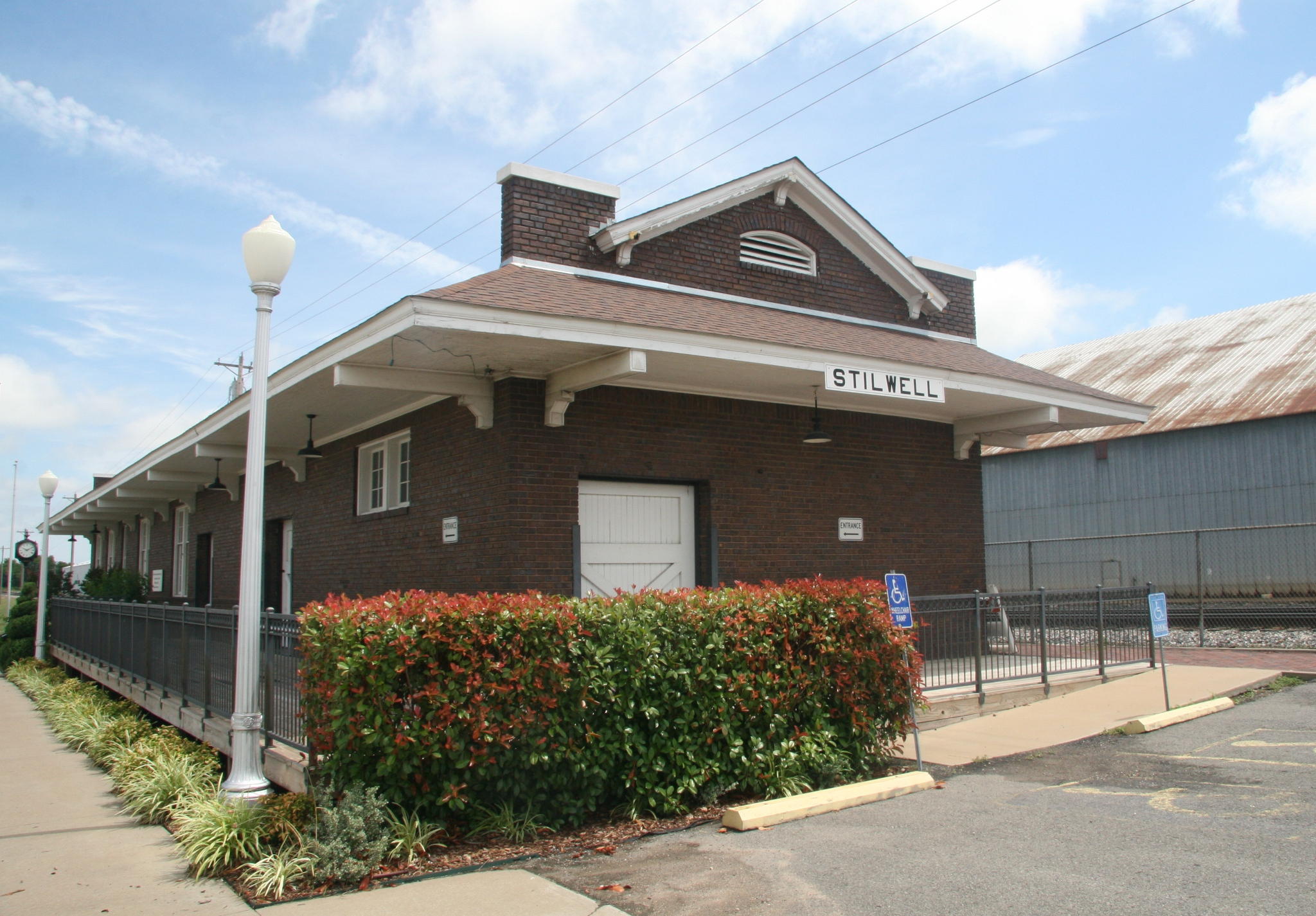
- Historic train station in Stilwell

- Logo

- Location within Adair County and the state of Oklahoma
- Coordinates: 35°48′55″N 94°37′53″W
- Country: United States
- State: Oklahoma
- County: Adair
- Incorporated: 1897
- Named for: Arthur Stilwell (Stilwell) / Strawberries (ᏍᏗᎳᏪᎵ)

Government
  - Type: Mayor and council
  - Mayor: Jean Ann Wright

Area
  - Total: 3.46 sq mi (8.95 km^{2})
  - Land: 3.43 sq mi (8.89 km^{2})
  - Water: 0.023 sq mi (0.06 km^{2})
- Elevation: 1,083 ft (330 m)

Population (2020)
  - Total: 3,700
  - Density: 1,077.7/sq mi (416.12/km^{2})
- Time zone: UTC-6 (Central (CST))
  - Summer (DST): UTC-5 (CDT)
- ZIP code: 74960
- Area codes: 539/918
- FIPS code: 40-70350
- GNIS feature ID: 2411983
- Per capita income: $12,872 per year
- Adult poverty rate: 37.2%
- Child poverty rate: 49.0%
- Website: cityofstilwell.com

Stilwell / ᏍᏗᎳᏪᎵ is a city located in the sovereign territory of the Cherokee Nation. It is the county seat of Adair County, and is home to the United Keetoowah Band of Cherokee Indians in Oklahoma. The population was 3,700 as of the 2020 U.S. census, a decline of 6.7 percent from the 3,949 population recorded in 2010. The Oklahoma governor and legislature proclaimed Stilwell as the "Strawberry Capital of the World" in 1949, but the role of strawberries in the local economy has diminished since then. Today, residents of Stilwell are among the poorest and most impoverished in the United States. Stilwell also serves as a gateway to Lake Tenkiller and Adair Park, formerly called Adair State Park before it was defunded.

== History ==
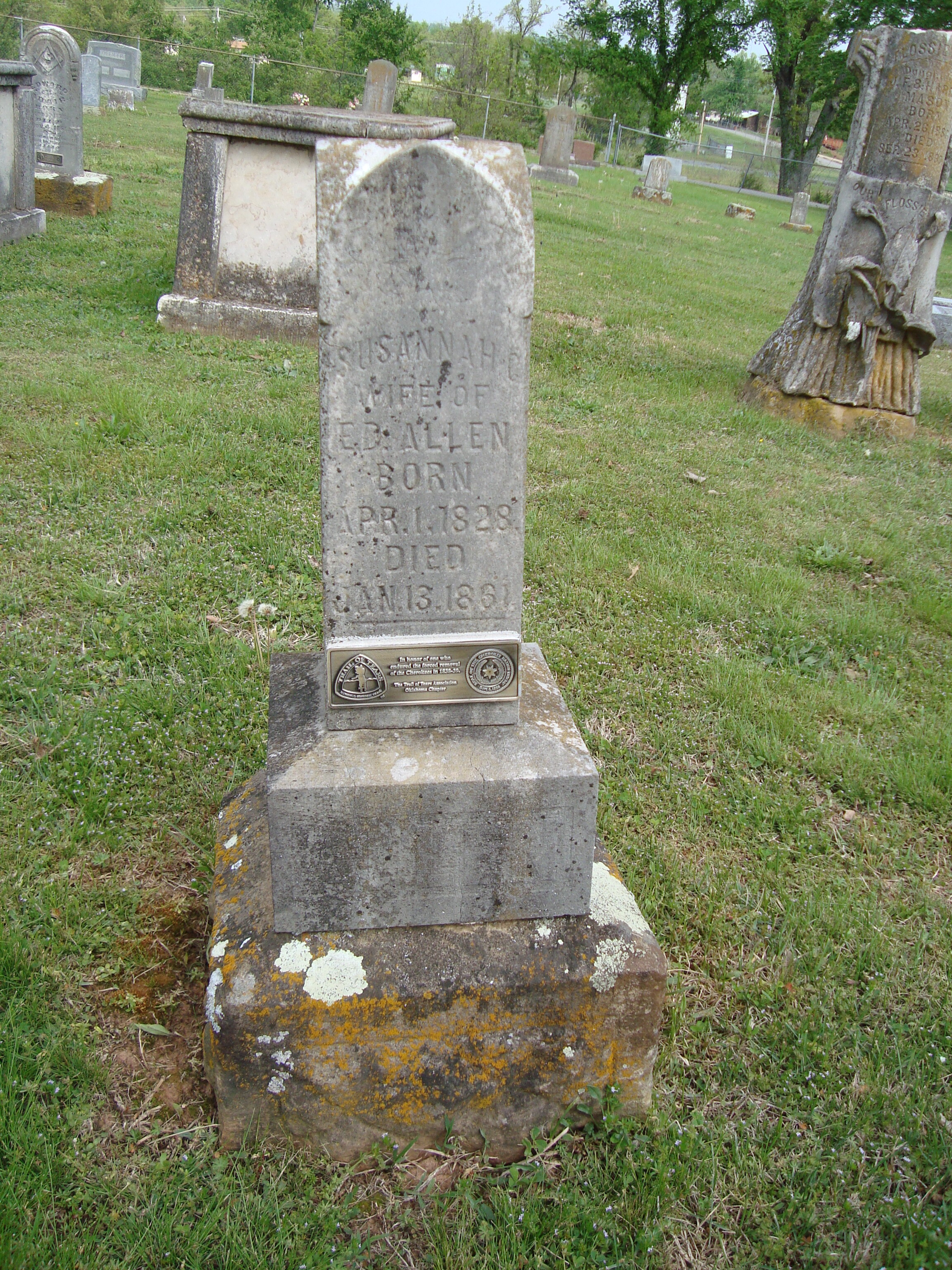
The grave of a victim of the Trail of Tears, in Stilwell

Stilwell's history began in 1838 as an end point of the Trail of Tears, with the ethnic cleansing and forced displacement of thousands of Indigenous people to the Stilwell area. The trail was called nu na da ul tsun yi in Cherokee language, or "the place where they cried". The U.S. federal government set up a “disbandment depot” outside what is present-day Stilwell in the early months of 1839 to distribute food and supplies to the newly arrived Indigenous people. Those with resources quickly left to settle across the rest of Indian Territory, but the sickest and poorest stayed in the Stilwell area, close to the safety of the depot.

The U.S. government opened the Stilwell area to American settlers in 1893. The Kansas City Southern Railway built a rail line through what is present-day Stilwell in 1896. The municipality developed because of the rail line and it was incorporated as a town on January 2, 1897. The town was named after Arthur Stilwell, founder of the Kansas City Southern Railway. By the turn of the twentieth century, white settlers outnumbered the Cherokee people.

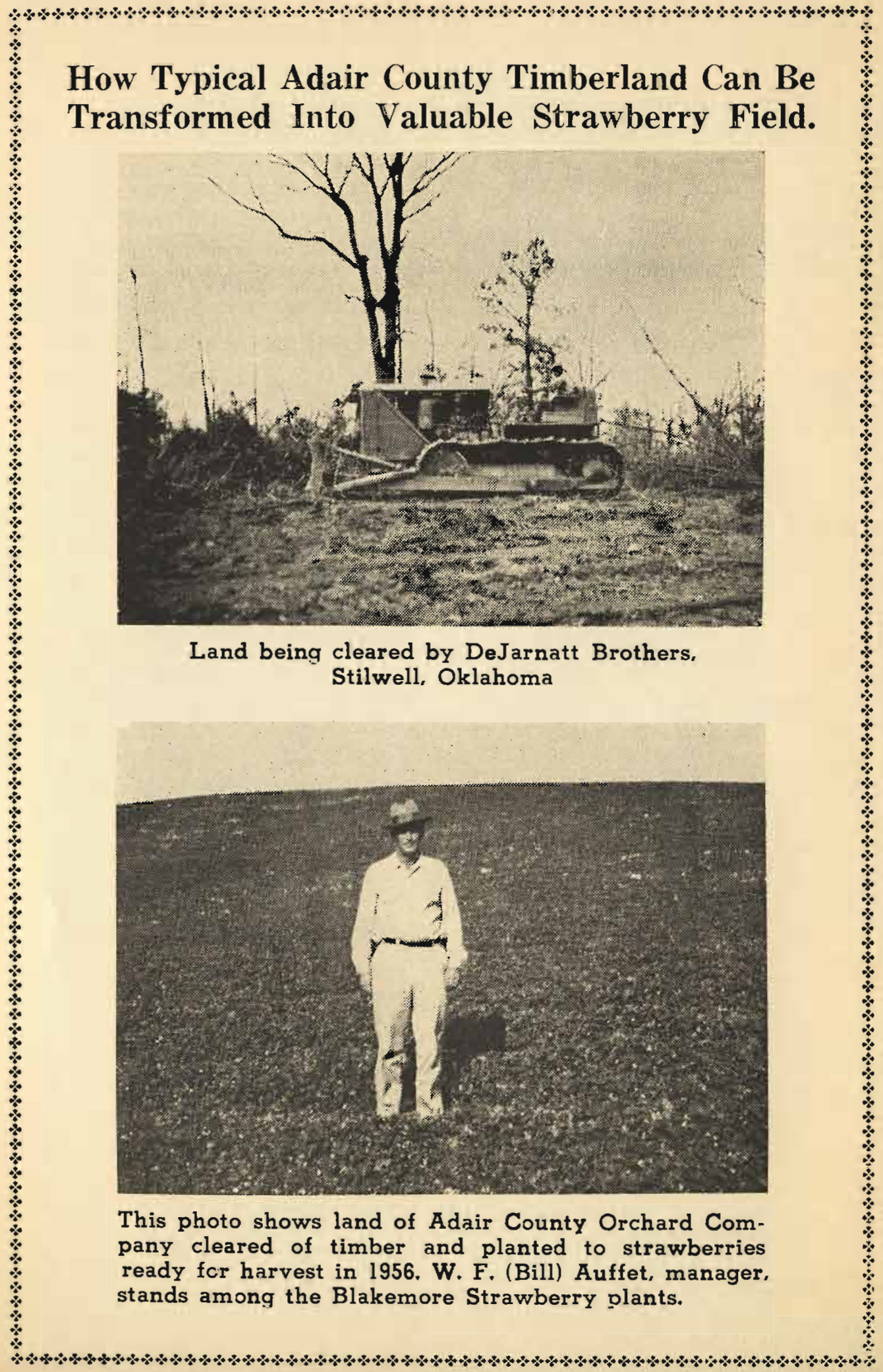
Forests cleared for strawberry farming in 1956

As early as 1901, Stilwell and Westville, in anticipation of Oklahoma statehood, vied for the role of county seat. When Adair County was formed in 1907, Westville was identified as the county seat, due partly to its location at the intersection of two major railroads: the Kansas City Southern Railway and the St. Louis–San Francisco Railway. After three intensely contested elections, however, Oklahoma governor Charles Haskell proclaimed Stilwell as the county seat on May 6, 1910.

In 1944, during World War II, a prisoner of war (P.O.W.) camp was established 5 miles (8.0 km) south of Stilwell. The camp housed 200 axis soldiers.

Stilwell was served by Kansas City Southern's Southern Belle passenger rail line until November 2, 1969. The rail line connected Stilwell with daily trains to New Orleans and Kansas City, with stops in Northwest Arkansas, Joplin, Shreveport, Baton Rouge and many other cities in-between. A second passenger line, The Flying Crow, also stopped in the town. The town's train station fell into disrepair due to vandalism and was closed on February 22, 1971. The station building itself was restored in 2004, though passenger rail service was not.

During the Great Depression, strawberries emerged a major crop and cornerstone of the local economy. In 1948, a strawberry festival was organized, and in 1949, the state governor and legislature proclaimed Stilwell as "Strawberry Capital of the World." Stilwell's strawberry festival became an annual event. Over time, the strawberry industry weakened, cultivated acreage decreased and the role of strawberries in the local economy dissipated. Despite this, Stilwell still holds a strawberry festival annually and the town's 2015 festival had approximately 30,000 people in attendance. Stilwell's 2022 strawberry festival featured the largest parade in its 75-year history with over 100 floats.

== Geography ==
Stilwell is 8 miles (13 km) west of the Arkansas state line and 23 miles (37 km) east of Tahlequah, Oklahoma. Stilwell is at the intersection of U.S. Highway 59 and State Highway 51. Sallisaw and Little Lee creeks are nearby. According to the United States Census Bureau, the town has a total area of 3.2 square miles (8.3 km^{2}), of which 3.2 square miles (8.3 km^{2}) is land and 0.04 square miles (0.10 km^{2}) (0.63%) is water.

Earthquakes are often felt in Stilwell due to oil and gas production activities in central Oklahoma.

According to Jennifer Patterson, Oklahoma State University Adair County Extension Director, Stilwell is good for growing strawberries because of its rocky, acidic soil and good drainage. Below the ground in Stilwell lays chert rock, which breaks down into the soil and purportedly gives strawberries a unique taste.

== Demographics ==
Historical population
Census	Pop.	Note	%±
1900	779		—
1910	1,039		33.4%
1920	1,155		11.2%
1930	1,366		18.3%
1940	1,717		25.7%
1950	1,813		5.6%
1960	1,916		5.7%
1970	2,134		11.4%
1980	2,369		11.0%
1990	2,663		12.4%
2000	3,276		23.0%
2010	3,949		20.5%
2020	3,700		−6.3%
U.S. Decennial Census

As of the 2020 census, Stilwell had a population of 3,700. The median age was 33.5 years. 28.9% of residents were under the age of 18 and 15.4% of residents were 65 years of age or older. For every 100 females there were 86.0 males, and for every 100 females age 18 and over there were 80.9 males age 18 and over. The population of Stilwell is declining.

=== 2020 census ===
0% of residents lived in urban areas, while 100.0% lived in rural areas.

There were 1,368 households in Stilwell, of which 37.5% had children under the age of 18 living in them. Of all households, 33.3% were married-couple households, 18.9% were households with a male householder and no spouse or partner present, and 39.9% were households with a female householder and no spouse or partner present. About 32.8% of all households were made up of individuals and 15.0% had someone living alone who was 65 years of age or older.

There were 1,583 housing units, of which 13.6% were vacant. Among occupied housing units, 41.2% were owner-occupied and 58.8% were renter-occupied. The homeowner vacancy rate was 2.7% and the rental vacancy rate was 9.4%.

Racial composition as of the 2020 census
Race	Percent
White	26.8%
Black or African American	0.3%
American Indian and Alaska Native	53.8%
Asian	0.9%
Native Hawaiian and Other Pacific Islander	0.1%
Some other race	6.2%
Two or more races	11.9%
Hispanic or Latino (of any race)	14.5%

== Economy ==
Stilwell's economy is characterized by high rates of poverty and low incomes. Residents of Stilwell are among the poorest and most impoverished in the United States.

The per capita income for Stilwell is $12,872 per year, and median household income is $31,637 per year, as of 2017. As of 2017, 37.2% of adults and 49.0% of children in Stilwell are living below the poverty line. Poverty in the town is increasing and 50.4% of residents do not have an internet subscription.

Agriculture has been the mainstay of the local economy for a century. Strawberry farming was particularly successful during the Great Depression and World War II. At its peak, the town had about 2,000 acres of farmland devoted to strawberries. Over time, the role of strawberries diminished significantly and only seven strawberry farms remained as of 2022. Ranching became important around 1960 and the town's local industries were largely an outgrowth of agriculture. Employers included Tyson Foods, the Stilwell Canning Company and its successor, Mrs. Smith's Bakery/Stilwell Foods, Cherokee Nation Industries, and Facet Industries. As of 2022, the minimum wage in Stilwell is $7.25 per hour. For full-time students, tipped employees, farm workers, seasonal workers and people with disabilities, the minimum wage is $2.13 per hour.

== Health ==
16% of adults in Stilwell have diabetes, 27% smoke, and 42% are obese, according to the Oklahoma State University Center for Health Sciences. Health services include the Cherokee Nation Wilma Mankiller Clinic and the Stilwell Nursing Home.

According to the Census Bureau, 28.5% of all residents, and 60% of those in Stilwell who are unemployed do not have health insurance.

=== Mercury contamination ===
According to the consensus of multiple studies, Stilwell's environment is contaminated with mercury. Mercury is present in both Stilwell's air and aquifer. Mercury contamination harms brain development and neurological function, impairs learning and behavior, damages renal and cardiovascular systems, disrupts immune and endocrine function, accumulates in ecosystems, and poses significant long-term ecological and public-health risks, even in low concentrations.

A comprehensive three-year study completed by the Environmental Protection Agency and others found "notable coal-fired power plant mercury emissions" in 2011. Between August 2009 and August 2011, mercury was deposited into Stilwell overwhelmingly through rain, fog, and other precipitation, accounting for 89% of measured contamination, with the remaining 11% occurring through dry deposition.

The Oklahoma Department of Environmental Quality warned residents against eating certain fish from Stilwell's city lake in 2019, due to mercury contamination.

=== "Early death capital of the world" ===
Stilwell was labelled the "early death capital of the world" after a detailed report by the National Center for Health Statistics surfaced in 2018 indicating the life expectancy of the town's residents was just 56.3 years. The agency stated the report was their "most detailed local health data ever released" and the life expectancy of Stilwell residents was lower than that in every jurisdiction in North America, Europe or Asia, with a similar life-expectancy to the poorest regions of sub-Saharan Africa. The Cherokee Nation disputed the report initially before further studies were done, stating the data "has to be flawed." In February 2020, the Centers for Disease Control and Prevention stated they would soon release their own report increasing the town's life expectancy figure to 74 years. The CDC stated that the National Center for Health Statistics report was "flawed" because 90 deceased individuals with P.O. box addresses in Stilwell that lived outside city limits were included in the report, producing inaccurate data. Stilwell's Roberts Reed Culver Funeral Home reports half of all funerals performed in 2018 were for people in their 50s and 60s.

=== COVID-19 response ===
Stilwell city council passed a mask mandate in response to the COVID-19 pandemic on July 8, 2020, taking advice from a local infectious disease specialist. Just 10 days later, city council struck down the mandate advising face masks were no longer required after receiving "extremely hostile" responses and threats against officials.

=== Memorial Hospital ===
==== History ====
Opening in 1977, Stilwell Memorial Hospital was a small medical center located in the town; serving as the area's only emergency department and inpatient facility. It provided 24/7 emergency stabilization, basic inpatient and outpatient care, diagnostics, and transfers, but was not a trauma center or full-service hospital. The facility replaced the earlier Stilwell Municipal Hospital, which opened as the town's first hospital in 1952 and was repurposed as the Stilwell Middle School cafeteria.

==== Closure ====
On June 20, 2025, Stilwell Memorial Hospital announced it would permanently close, with services sunsetting just one week later. Residents and staff were reportedly shocked by the abrupt announcement. While no single cause was officially identified, financial strain was a central factor in the closure. Inpatients were transferred to hospitals in other regions, with some sent out-of-state.

The hospital's emergency department, the only in the town, was closed in late June. The hospital was abandoned by July 2025.

==== Responses ====
The closure drew profound alarm from residents over their sudden lack of access to health and emergency services, and national discourse about America's poverty and health crises at large. One concern among residents and officials is the increased travel time and difficulty in reaching the nearest hospitals. The nearest inpatient facilities to Stilwell are in Tahlequah, 23 miles (37 km) west, Sallisaw, 29 miles (47 km) south, and Siloam Springs, Arkansas, 32 miles (51 km) northeast. In July 2025, the Democratic National Committee raised a billboard in Stilwell reading, "UNDER TRUMP'S WATCH, STILWELL GENERAL HOSPITAL IS CLOSING ITS DOORS" before being later removed. Significant concern and uncertainty persist due to the ongoing absence of health and emergency services in Stilwell.

== Education ==
Stilwell Public Schools provides education for children from kindergarten through twelfth grade. There is one elementary school, one middle school and one high school. Technical and vocational studies beyond high school level are offered by the Indian Capital Technology Center campus in Stilwell.

Stilwell was home to the Flaming Rainbow University, a private, baccalaureate university between 1971–1989. Despite being dubbed a "non-traditional university", it obtained accreditation from the Oklahoma State Regents for Higher Education in 1974 and was accredited by the North Central Association of Colleges and Schools. According to its founder, David Hilligoss, the school was created to "Provide an education to Isolated Indians and rural whites in this beautifully treed and poverty stricken section of the state". The Flaming Rainbow University was named in honor of a Sioux medicine man's vision, which featured a rainbow symbolizing knowledge and its power. The university lost all accreditation in 1989 and closed.

== Government ==
Stilwell has a mayor-council form of government, with five members on the city council. City departments reporting to the mayor include the police department, volunteer fire department, sewer and garbage service, natural gas and electric service. As of 2021, the mayor of Stilwell is Jean Ann Wright. She was elected in 2019 and is the first Indigenous woman to hold the office.

The town has voted staunchly Republican for over 45 years. 77.5% of voters in Stilwell voted for Donald Trump in the 2020 U.S. presidential election.

After being de-funded and closed by the Oklahoma state government, Adair Park in Stilwell has since been acquired by the county government. The municipal government bans the sale of alcohol on Sundays, in addition to 7 holidays per year.

== Crime ==
Stilwell has one of the highest crime rates in America, compared to communities of all sizes. The crime rate in Stilwell is 122% higher than the national average, and 71% higher than the state average. Violent crime has increased every year since 2009 and Stilwell has an incarceration rate higher than what's found in every other country in the world. The murder rate in Stilwell is 10 per 100,000 people, double the national average. In response to the town's high crime rate, Stilwell has a year-round curfew in place that prohibits people under the age of 18 from being in public past midnight.

Three bombs were detonated in Stilwell on January 23, 2012. The Federal Bureau of Investigation (FBI), Bureau of Alcohol, Tobacco, Firearms and Explosives (ATF), Oklahoma Highway Patrol, Adair County Sheriffs, and Stilwell city police investigated the explosions. The investigation concluded the explosions were intentional and were caused by pipe bombs.

Approximately 12 miles (19 km) southeast of Stilwell is Elohim City, an armed, evangelical, white supremacist compound with alleged ties to the Oklahoma City Bombing. The enclave has ties to myriad criminal, terror and racist organizations, including the Aryan Resistance Movement. An Associated Press investigation from 2003 concluded that white supremacists from Elohim City played a "major role" in the bombing of the Alfred P. Murrah Federal Building that killed 168 people. The Southern Poverty Law Center calls the compound "the meeting ground for America's most sinister extremists".

== Infrastructure ==
=== Transportation ===
==== Airports ====
Painting Planes Airport is the primary general aviation airport for Stilwell. It has a single 4,208-foot (1,283 m) runway and is located three miles (4.8 km) southwest of the town. The airport is in poor condition and lacks basic facilities such as a wind cone. The runway's numbers and markings are faded and its surface is in disrepair with many cracks. The closest commercial service airport is Northwest Arkansas National Airport (often referred to by its IATA airport code, XNA) and is located 51 miles (82 km) northeast of Stilwell, out of state.

==== Highways ====
Stilwell sits at the confluence of three highways, U.S. Highway 59 and Oklahoma State Highways 51 and 100.

==== Pedestrian and cycling ====
There are minimal pedestrian facilities in Stilwell. Almost all city streets do not have sidewalks, aside from a few of the oldest streets in the downtown area. Many of these sidewalks are in disrepair. There are no paved pathways outside parks and there is no cycling infrastructure in the town. Almost all errands require an automobile, according to Walk Score, an online, independently calculated walkability index that, based on a number of metrics, provides a score on how walkable an area is.

==== Public transportation ====
There is a limited on-demand transit service in the town, privately operated by the KI BOIS Area Transit System. Though the service is open to the public, it is not widely used and its primary purpose is to provide low-cost rides to disadvantaged, elderly and impoverished Stilwell residents. There are no fixed bus routes, intercity buses or passenger rail services in Stilwell.

==== Railways ====
Stilwell is situated on the Kansas City Southern (KCS) main line, it runs north and south through the east end of the town.

== NRHP Sites ==
Sites in Stilwell listed on the National Register of Historic Places include:

- The Adair County Courthouse, on Division Street
- Golda's Mill; the ruins are 12 miles northwest
- The KCS Railway Depot, off US Route 59

== Notable people ==
- Sam Claphan, Cherokee, former football player for the Oklahoma Sooners and San Diego Chargers of the NFL.
- Frankie Hargis (1965–2021), Cherokee Nation Registrar (2018–2021), Tribal Councilor (2011–2018)
- Wanda Hatfield, Cherokee Nation tribal councilor (2015–2019)
- Wilma Mankiller, the first female principal chief of the Cherokee Nation.
- Samuel Mayes, principal Chief of the Cherokee Nation in Indian Territory (present-day Oklahoma), serving from 1895 to 1899.

== See also ==
- Cookson Hills
- Strawberry Festival
