= College Park (Oxnard, California) =

Park in Ventura County, California, US

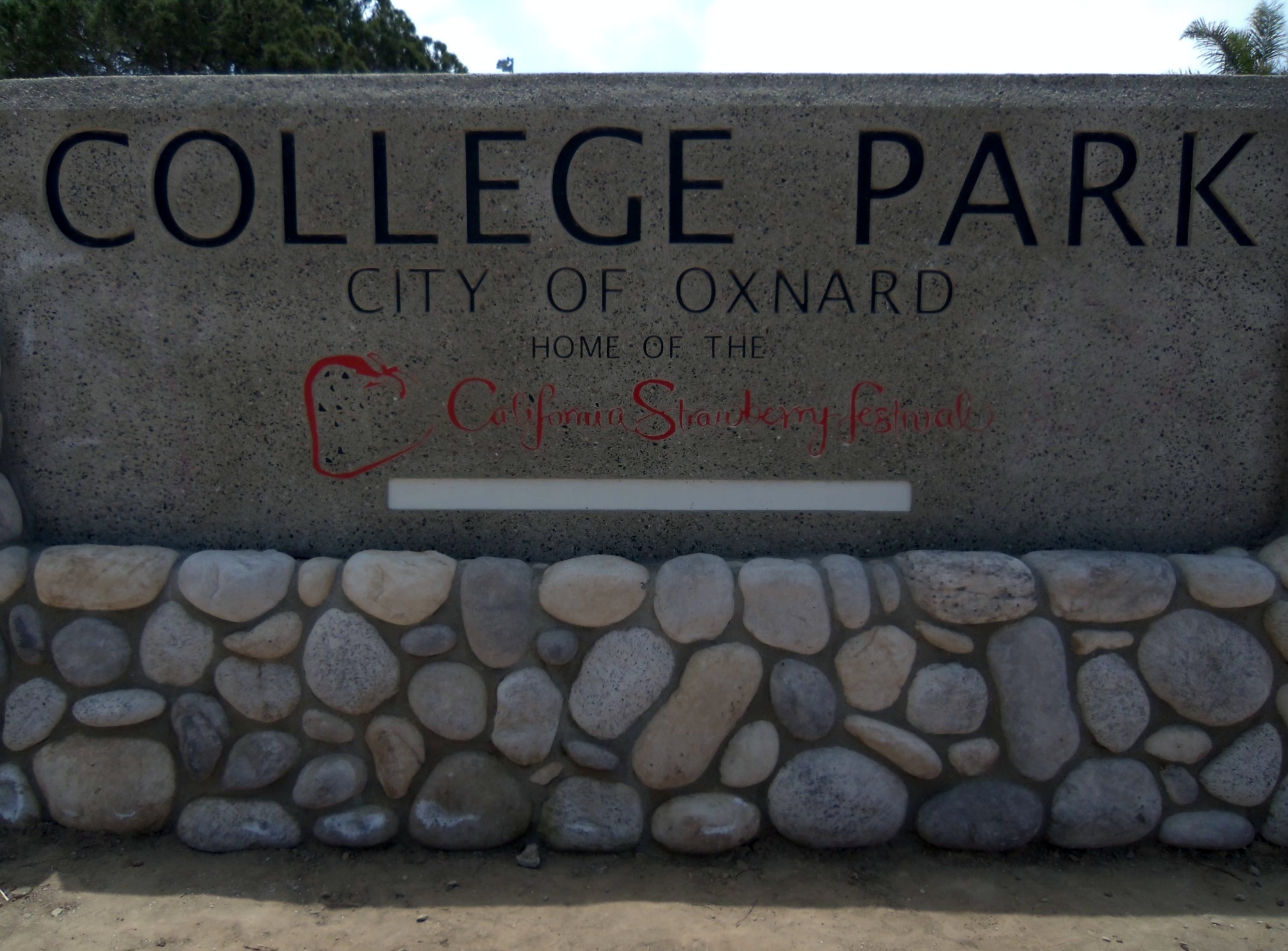
- Entrance sign in 2012
- Interactive map of College Park
- Location: 3250 South Rose Avenue, Oxnard, California, US
- Coordinates: 34°10′12″N 119°09′27″W
- Area: 75 acres (30 ha)
- Operator: City of Oxnard, California
- Open: 7:00 a.m. to 7:00 p.m.
- Terrain: Urban meadow
- Website: oxnard.gov/college-park

College Park is a municipal park and recreation area located in Oxnard, California, United States. The California Strawberry Festival was held in the park's Strawberry Meadows section for 28 years.

== Description ==
The 75-acre (30 ha) park is flanked to the south by Oxnard College, and to the west—across South Rose Avenue—by Channel Islands High School. In addition to playgrounds and grassy areas, the park has facilities for various sports including baseball, soccer and cross country running. It has been used on occasion by the Oxnard Fire Department to stage their training drills.

== History ==
The early history of the Oxnard Plain is characterized by its agricultural heritage. In 1985, a Rainbow Recovery Center women's drug rehabilitation franchise was set up in two old farmhouses on the north side of the property that would come to be known as College Park. Starting in 1991, the California Strawberry Festival was held at a portion of the park known as Strawberry Meadows for 28 years until 2019, after which it was halted for three years due to the COVID-19 pandemic. The festival moved to the Ventura County Fairgrounds in 2023. While the park's lack of fixed seating generally made it unattractive for music concerts (festival-goers generally sat on hay bales), The Reggae Jam on the Coast festival began to be hosted there starting in 1994, which drew thousands of patrons each year. The following year, Mexican Independence Day was celebrated in the park with a large fiesta.

Originally, 50 acres (20 ha) of the park was owned by the city of Oxnard, while the remaining 25 acres (10 ha) belonged to Ventura County. In 1998, Oxnard turned its portion of the property over to the county, and the park immediately began to be the subject of discussion amongst public officials regarding the question of what constituted the best possible usage of the grounds. Some of the proposals including adding a water park and a Minor League Baseball field. Eventually, county officials came to the conclusion that the expenditures far exceeded any potential revenue that the county might have been able to receive from running the park, so in April 2000 they transferred the entire property back to the city of Oxnard. The deed stipulated that development of the property was to be limited to "parks and recreation purposes" only. A proposal for a farm museum that was brought before the city council in 2002 was controversial; it called for one of the farmhouses then occupied by the drug rehabilitation center to be appropriated for use by the museum. This necessitated the eviction and possible closure of the rehab facility, a move that was opposed by the mayor, Manuel Lopez. The mayor tasked his staff with pleading the case with county officials, in the hope that an interpretation of the deed could be found that would allow the facility to remain. The facility's director claimed she received many letters from residents who also opposed the eviction. The $15-million master plan for the property—which was to include a 3-acre (1.2 ha) park, a 9-acre (3.6 ha) dog park, baseball and soccer fields, picnic areas, playgrounds, a community center and gym, jogging and bicycle trails, and a farm heritage museum area complete with a blacksmith's shop—called for the rehab facility's relocation no later than January 2004. In 2023, a recreation center complete with an Olympic-size swimming pool was still in the planning stages.
