= William Dutch =

Prominent leader of the Old Settler Cherokee

- ᏔᏥ
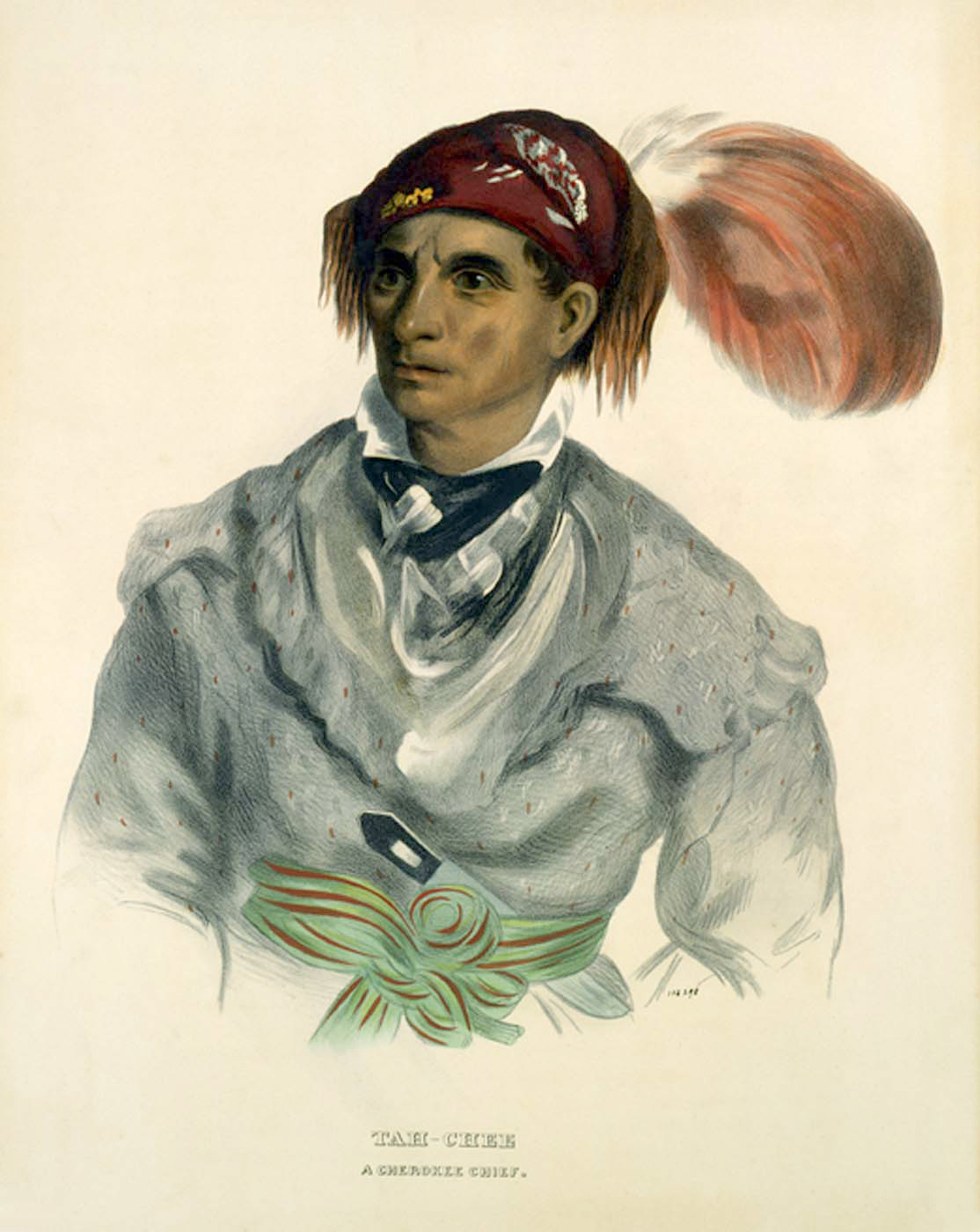
- Tah-Chee (Dutch), a Cherokee chief; portrait by Charles Bird King, 1837
- Born: Tahchee c. 1790; Turkeytown
- Died: October 12, 1848; Flint District, Indian Territory
- Other name: Tatsi
- Citizenship: Cherokee Nation
- Known for: Prominent leader of the Cherokee Old Settlers and notorious enemy of the Osage.
- Parent: Chief Skyugo

William Dutch or Tahchee (Cherokee: ᏔᏥ, romanized: Tatsi), c. 1790–1848 was a prominent leader of the Cherokee "Old Settlers" in the American West. He was renowned as a notorious enemy of the Osage tribe, and a spokesman for the Cherokee.

== Moving west ==
Tahchee was born about 1790 in Turkeytown in what today is Alabama. He was the third son of Chief Skyugo. When young he moved with his mother and an uncle, Thomas Taylor, to St. Francis River, Arkansaw Territory. As an adult he was portrayed as a five feet and eleven inches tall man of agile movements with an expression of self-possession, daring and determination. Conflict with the Osage over hunting rights south of the Arkansas River in the area called Lovely's Purchase led to a long period of internecine warfare between the two nations that included the Battle of Claremore Mound. In 1822 General Edmund Gaines negotiated a treaty that included sharing of hunting rights south of the Arkansas River and west of Fort Smith. It also required both nations to surrender perpetrators of acts of war to the military for trial.

== War with the Osage ==
Tahchee and his followers moved south of the Arkansas River and adamantly refused US government orders to move north. In 1825 he moved to Red River, at the mouth of the Kiamichi River where he and his followers continued to make war on the Osage in spite of the presence of General Matthew Arbuckle and 250 soldiers of the regular army. Dissatisfied with the 1822 treaty, Chief Takatoka merged his forces with Tahchee and joined him in raiding the Osage. In order to end the warfare, the US government created Fort Gibson among the Osage, and Fort Towson at the Red River settlement of Tahchee.

Tahchee continued his warfare with the Osage, and he was declared an outlaw by the Western Cherokee. After some years he moved to The Bowl's Settlement in Texas. There he participated in the destruction of a Tawakoni village. Returning to Red River he continued his warfare against the Osage. The US Army now set a price of 500 dollars on his head. To show his contempt for the reward, he attacked and scalped an Osage in the vicinity of the fort. After peace had been established with the Osage in 1832, the reward was withdrawn and the outlawry ended and Tahchee was induced by Chief John Jolly to move back to the Cherokee Nation.

Several authors claim that Tahchee's hostility towards the Osage was preceded by a period of close friendship with them. He lived among them, identified with them and participated in their hunting expeditions and campaigns. He even married an Osage woman. When the Osage for some reason killed his wife, he became their irreconcilable enemy, killing Osage people without further provocation wherever he could find any.

== George Catlin ==
George Catlin met Tahchee when he served as guide and hunter for the United States Dragoon Regiment, on their expedition to the Comanches in 1834. He pronounced him "one of the most extraordinary men that lives on the frontiers at the present time", personally known to all the officers of the US Army that have been stationed in the area. By "desperate warfare" with the Osage and Comanche, he had successfully created a fine land by the Canadian River where he enjoyed a comfortable life.

== Spokesman for the Old Settlers ==
During the contentious years after the arrival of the Eastern Cherokees under Principal Chief John Ross that were forced to go west after the signing of the Treaty of New Echota in 1835, Tahchee became an important spokesman for the Old Settler Cherokees. Although the Old Settlers most often cooperated with the Treaty Party they sometimes worked with the majority under Ross. Tahchee was one of the petitioners that in 1837 together with John Ross and others had appealed to the United States government questioning the legality of the New Echota Treaty.

A faction of the Old Settlers deposed Chief John Brown and elected John Rogers Principal Chief of the Cherokee Nation—West in 1839, with Tahchee as third chief. His election was contested by members of the Treaty Party who protested to Indian Agent Montfort Stokes in 1840. General Matthew Arbuckle Jr. of the United States Army dissolved this government the following year.

After The Removal, when the Cherokee Nation of Oklahoma organized its government, it created eight districts, each divided into two precincts. The enabling act of 1840 named Tahchee one of two election superintendents of the second precinct of the Canadian District. He was also a committeeman (senator) in 1840. Under the new constitution of the Cherokee Nation of 1840, he was elected a member of the executive council, but he refused to serve and joined the opposition. When the Treaty Party in 1840 attempted a merger with the Old Settlers, a delegation which among its members contained Tahchee was appointed and sent to Washington to present their claims as the legal government of the Cherokee Nation.

Tahchee was elected National Committeeman (senator) from the Canadian District 1841, 1843, 1847. He was also one of the signers of the 1843 compact between the Cherokee, the Creek, and the Osage. At the meeting between the Indian Agent Pierce M. Butler and members of the Treaty Party and Old Settlers in 1844, Tahchee was spokesman for the Old Settlers.

The Treaty of Washington 1846 between the United States and the Cherokee named Tahchee as one of the representatives of the Western Cherokees or Old Settlers. When the Western Cherokee faction met to consider the claims it were entitled to according to the treaty, Dutch presided. In 1847 he was elected one of three delegates to go to Washington to secure the money due to them under the treaty. In January 1848, Tahchee was among the men instructed by a portion of Old Settlers to visit Washington.

== Death ==
Tahchee died November 12, 1848, at his home on the Canadian River in the Flint District. The National Council received news of his death two days later. His obituary appeared in Nile's National Register in 1849, referring to his enmity towards the Osage and the killing of his wife as a reason.
