= Cherokee in Arkansas =

The Cherokee in Arkansas were a faction of the Native American (Indian) Cherokee tribe. Their homeland was in the southern Appalachian Mountains. In the late 18th century, some Cherokee began emigrating into the future state of Arkansas. Encroachment on their lands by whites caused them to emigrate. Most of them initially settled along the St. Francis River on the border of Arkansas and Missouri. When that settlement was destroyed by earthquakes in 1811 and 1812, they moved to the valley of the Arkansas River where their settlements thrived, reaching a population of five to six thousand people. The Cherokee encroached on the lands of the Osage and the two tribes warred with each other; however, another important threat to the Cherokee was encroachment by Anglo-American settlers on their lands. In 1828, their presence in Arkansas having become untenable, the Cherokee negotiated a treaty with the United States, giving up their land in Arkansas for new lands in what would later become the state of Oklahoma. In 1828 and 1829, they moved to Oklahoma. A larger group of Cherokees still living in the southern Appalachians followed them to Oklahoma in 1839.

== Background ==
The Cherokee first came into contact with whites in 1540 when they were visited in western North Carolina by Hernando de Soto. In the 18th century they occupied the southern Appalachian Mountains in western North Carolina, Tennessee, Georgia, South Carolina and Alabama. They numbered more than 20,000. During the Revolutionary War (1775–1783) the Cherokee supported and occasionally fought on the side of the British.The reaction from the Anglo-Americans was devastating to the Cherokee. Their towns on the Tennessee River were destroyed and they were forced to cede large parts of their traditional lands to the United States. In 1794, after a lengthy guerrilla war, the Cherokee made a durable peace with the United States.

The first record of Cherokees on the western side of the Mississippi river is 1782 when Cherokee refugees petitioned the Spanish government to settle there. They were welcomed by the Spanish who saw them as allies against the powerful Osage. They traded at Arkansas Post. They settled near the Spanish settlements of Cape Girardeau and New Madrid, Missouri and along the St. Francis River, along the border between what became Missouri and Arkansas. By 1800 as many as 1,000 Cherokee were living in the trans-Mississippi. In 1801, Thomas Jefferson became President of the United States. He had a policy of removing Indians from east of the Mississippi River to the west. Resettlement of the Indians in Arkansas was a priority as the region was lightly populated, serving as a hunting territory for the aggressive Osage. An increasing number of Cherokee living in the east were forced to move westward by white encroachment on their lands. With the Louisiana Purchase in 1803, Arkansas became part of the United States.

The majority of the Cherokee migrating westward to Arkansas were from the Chickamaugua or Lower Cherokee, a militant and traditionalist faction of the Cherokee who lived near Chattanooga, Tennessee. They were outcasts from the Cherokee leadership. The Cherokees living in Arkansas prior to the 1830s were called the "old settlers."

== St. Francis settlement ==
Although a few Cherokee were in Arkansas and Missouri, the Muscle Shoals "massacre" in Alabama in 1794 caused many more to flee their homeland. The "massacre" came about when a group of white settlers traveling on rafts killed a Cherokee. In retaliation the Cherokee killed all the men in the settler party and took the women, children, and African-American slaves hostage. Realizing that the U.S. would retaliate for the deaths of the white men, Cherokee chief The Bowl led a group of people by raft down the Tennessee and Ohio Rivers, crossed the Mississippi River, and settled along the St. Francis River in Spanish territory. An U.S. government later cleared The Bowl and his followers of wrongdoing, but they remained along the St. Francis rather than returning the southern Appalachians. The women and children taken hostage by the Cherokee were released unharmed, but twenty-two African-American slaves remained among the Cherokee when the whites refused to repurchase them. A trickle of Cherokees followed, joining the group on the St. Francis. Ten families and a few single men joined the colony in 1796. In addition to the loss of their lands in the East, a motive for their immigration was depletion of game in their hunting grounds in the southern Appalachians. The Cherokee had long depended upon sale of deer skins and other animal products to the whites for much of their livelihood.

The largest migration to the St. Francis settlements came in 1809 under the leader Tahlonteeskee. He led a group of 1,200 Cherokee to the St. Francis along with "more than 1,000 cattle, hundreds of horses and pigs, and dozens of spinning wheels, loom, and plows along with 68 black slaves. Despite encroachments by whites and war with the Osage, the settlement was beginning to thrive when in late 1811 and early 1812 the New Madrid Earthquakes caused a flood which inundated most of the Cherokee villages and agricultural land. In June 1812, in the aftermath of the earthquakes and with increasing encroachment by whites, a millenarian movement arose in which the Cherokee undertook purification ceremonies and attempted to return to traditional culture. A prophet named Skaquaw (the Swan) told the Cherokee to move westward, away from the St. Francis. Most of the Cherokees soon abandoned their farms and followed his vision.

== Arkansas River valley ==
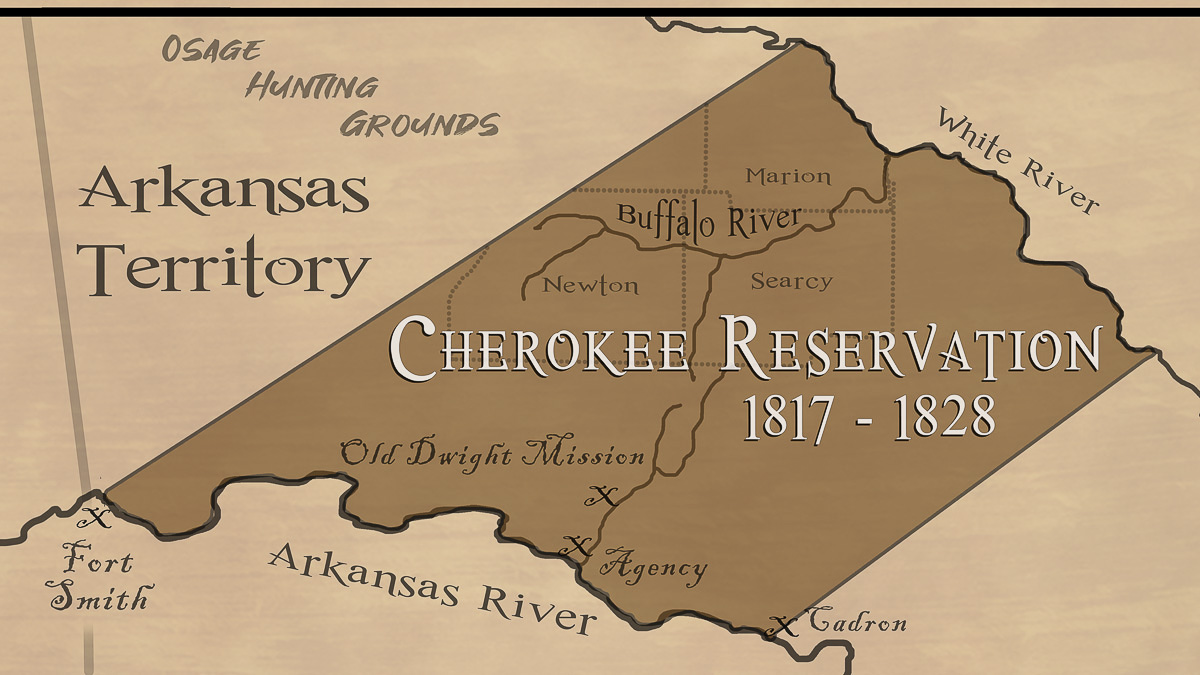
The Cherokee reservation in Arkansas

In 1805, enough Cherokee were in the Arkansas River valley that trader John B. Treat created a trading post at Spadra Rock, near the present-day city of Clarksville, Arkansas. With the arrival of refugees from the St. Francis river in 1812, the Cherokee population in the Arkansas River valley reached 2,000. in 1812, William Lewis Lovely became the first Indian Agent of the U.S. Department of War to be assigned to the Arkansas Cherokees. Lovely called the area the "Garden of the World," reflecting its fertility. His problems were mostly trying to prevent war between the Cherokee and the Osage and mediating between the Cherokee and the encroaching white settlers, some of whom he described as being "of the worst character." He requested two companies of U.S. soldiers to protect the Cherokees. In 1817 Fort Smith was established to keep peace on the frontier and a reservation was awarded to them.

Relationships between the Cherokee remaining in the east and those in Arkansas were not good and were exacerbated by treaties in 1817 and 1819 which ceded five million acres (2 million hectares) of land in the east for a Cherokee reserve of three million acres (1.2 million hectares) in Arkansas. Dissatisfied with the treaties, some Cherokee moved to Spanish-controlled Texas. In 1818, the Osage ceded land to the United States west of Cherokee lands in what became Oklahoma and the Cherokee acquired new hunting grounds and an outlet to the bison herds of the Great Plains.The negotiations of the treaties were facilitated by "gifts" (bribes) to some Cherokee leaders. The treaties also encouraged and offered help to Cherokee who decided to immigrate from east to west. By 1828, the Cherokee population in Arkansas and Oklahoma was 5,000 to 6,000.

Naturalist Thomas Nuttall visited the Cherokee living in the Arkansas River valley in 1819. He said, "Both banks of the river, as we proceeded, were lined with the houses and farms of the Cherokee, and though their dress was a mixture of indigenous and European taste, yet in their houses, which are decently furnished, and in their farms, which are well fenced and stocked with cattle, we perceive a happy approach toward civilization...Some of them are posssessed of property to the amount of many thousands of dollars, have houses handsomely and conveniently furnished, and their tables spread with our dainties and luxuries."

By 1828, Cherokee lands in Arkansas were encircled by white settlements and President John Quincy Adams favored the settlers. A Cherokee delegation traveled to Washington and on 6 May 1828, an agreement was reached with the U.S. The Cherokee leaders ceded all their land in Arkansas to the United States. They received in return 7,000,000 acres (2,800,000 ha) in what would become Oklahoma; access, called the Cherokee Outlet, to the buffalo prairies of the Great Plains; and more than 60,000 dollars in cash. The Cherokee delegates also received "gifts" for signing, including 500 dollars for Sequoyah, the creator of a syllabary of the Cherokee language. As the delegation had been instructed not to cede land, its members were afraid to return to Arkansas. The Cherokee in Arkansas planned to behead them when they returned, but the furor subsided. In 1829, the Arkansas Cherokee completed their emigration to their new lands in Oklahoma, ending their presence in Arkansas. They would be joined in Oklahoma ten years later by their kinsmen from the east who were forced off their lands in the southern Appalachians.
