= Tahlonteeskee, Oklahoma =

First capital city of the early western Cherokee Nation

Coordinates: 35.513°N 95.082°W

Tahlonteeskee, Oklahoma (variant: Tahlontuskey; Cherokee: ᏓᎶᎥᏗᏍᎩ, romanized: Dalonvdisgi) was the first capital city of the early western Cherokee Nation. It was named for Tahlonteeskee, who was the third Principal Chief of the Cherokee Nation -West (1817–1819). Today, the area of the settlement is an abandoned, barren site on private land in Sequoyah County.

== History ==
The area in which Tahlonteeskee was located was part of the 1816 Lovely's Purchase. The town itself was founded in 1828, near the mouth of the Illinois River, and became the capital of the Cherokee "Old Settlers" living in the Cherokee Nation–West. Chief John Jolly, brother of Tahlonteeskee, posthumously named the town in his honor. The Christian Dwight Mission was re-located there with the early nineteenth century migration west of the Cherokee people.

Tahlonteeskee continued as the western Cherokee peoples' capital from 1828 through 1839, when new arrivals from the Trail of Tears flooded the area. At that time, Takatoka briefly became capital before the transition of the council seat to Tahlequah, Oklahoma was finished—upon completion of the construction of the new capitol building—and the seat of the government permanently moved away. Tahlonteeskee continued for years as a council meeting place for Old Settlers in order to settle differences between differing tribal factions.

Tahlonteeskee was the oldest governmental capital in Oklahoma, but is today a barren site on private land near Gore, Oklahoma.

== See also ==
- List of ghost towns in Oklahoma
