= Takatoka =

Cherokee leader

Takatoka (Degadoga, Tatoka; c. 1755 – 1824) was the second Principal Chief of the Cherokee Nation—West (1813–1817) established in the old Arkansas Territory.

== Life ==
Takatoka was an early Cherokee Old Settler who emigrated to the Arkansas area of the Missouri Territory in 1810. He eventually settled in Lovely's Purchase.

== Tribal leadership ==
He rose to the office of principal chief after the departure of his predecessor, The Bowl (or Di'wali). The Bowl had been a past Chickamauga leader who had led Takatoka and several hundred followers into 'the west' to escape the influence and constant frontier encroachment of the rapidly expanding United States. He was replaced as principal chief by Tahlonteeskee in 1817. Takatoka served as war chief of the western Cherokee during the hostilities between the Cherokee settlers and the Osage that lasted from 1813 to 1823.

In summer 1822, Chief Takatoka merged his forces with the Cherokee outlaw, William Dutch, and joined him in raiding the Osage. In order to end the warfare, the US government created Fort Gibson among the Osage, and Fort Towson at the Red River settlement of Tahchee's base camp.

== Proposed confederacy ==
Later that same summer, Takatoka proposed a plan to Shawnee headman, John Lewis, to create a Native American confederacy of tribes in Arkansas and the southern Missouri Territory area. The confederacy would include the Shawnee, Cherokee, Lenape, Senecas and other eastern tribes, and would defend against white squatters as well as Osages, who were in frequent conflict with the constant stream of Cherokee immigrants. He enlisted support for his plan from Lewis, who brought the idea to Indian Agents William Clark and Pierre Menard. Secretary of War, John C. Calhoun was also a supporter of the coalition.

== Death ==
While travelling en route to Washington D.C. during an 1823 diplomatic mission in support of his proposed confederacy, he became ill in Kaskaskia, Illinois, and quickly died in the home of Indian Agent Menard, one of the richest men in Illinois at the time.

Preceded by The Bowl	Principal Chief of the Cherokee Nation West; 1813–1817	Succeeded by Tahlonteeskee
