= The Bowl (Cherokee chief) =

Cherokee chief (ca.1756-1839)

The Bowl (also Chief Bowles or Bowls); John Watts Bowles (Cherokee: Di'wali) (c. 1756 – July 16, 1839) was one of the leaders of the Chickamauga Cherokee during the Cherokee–American wars, served as a principal chief of the Cherokee Nation–West, and was a leader of the Texas Cherokees (Tshalagiyi nvdagi).

== Early life ==
Di'wali was born around 1756 in Little Hiwassee, a Cherokee town in current-day North Carolina near Tomotla. His mother was mixed-blood Cherokee, Ghigoneli Boles, and his father John Watts was half Scottish and half Cherokee. Emmet Starr, an early historian of the Cherokee, describes Bowles as "being decidedly Gaelic in appearance, having light eyes, red hair, and somewhat freckled." At the age of 11, when his maternal grandfather John Knight Boles was murdered, he tracked down the men and killed them. In tradition of Indian naming patterns, he took the name of Boles becoming John Watts Boles. The Osage word for bowl is di'wali which is what history has recorded him as.

== Young warrior ==
Di'wali was a follower of his maternal cousin, (grandparents Muskrat Moytoy and Nancy Rainmaker were siblings) Dragging Canoe, one of the founders of the Chickamauga Cherokee, who supported the British during the American Revolutionary War. He fought under Dragging Canoe and his brother John Watts"Young Tassel" during the Cherokee-American wars. During this time, Di'wali had become the chief of the Running Water Town (present-day Whiteside, Tennessee). After the destruction of the Chickamauga settlements by the Americans in 1794, Di'wali returned to Little Hiwassee.

== On the move ==
To enjoy better hunting grounds and escape the pressures of growing white settlements in the southern states, Di'wali led the first large Cherokee emigration west across the Mississippi River in 1794, where his followers and he established a settlement in the Louisiana Territory along the St. Francis River (near present-day New Madrid, Missouri). Continued problems with the Osage resulted in efforts to get the Shawnee and Delaware to relocate to Arkansas, as well. The Osage name for Bowl was Duwali. When the tribal government was organized in 1809 with the arrival of additional Old Settlers, he was elected the first principal chief of the Cherokee Nation–West. In 1812-13, following the New Madrid Earthquake, many of his group moved north on the White River while Di'wali moved others south near present-day Conway, Arkansas. Di'wali was succeeded as the principal chief of the Cherokee Nation–West in 1813 by Degadoga.

Responding to the influx of white settlers into the Arkansas Territory, in the winter of 1819-1820, Di'wali led about 60 Cherokee families into Spanish Texas, settling for two years in Northeast Texas along the Red River. The community elected Di'wali as head chief (ugu). With the influx of white settlers into the Red River area, Di'wali once again moved his community, this time to the valley of the Trinity River, near present-day Dallas. They moved again the following year into a region 50 miles north of present-day Nacogdoches, Texas. At this time, Richard Fields succeeded Di'wali as the leader of the "Cherokee and their associated bands."

After entering into a November 8, 1822, agreement with José Félix Trespalacios, the governor of the Coahuila y Tejas, calling for "peaceful possession" of lands in east Texas, Fields and Di'wali traveled to Mexico City the following winter, and petitioned the Mexican government for a treaty to be allowed to permanently settle there. In his 1898 essay, "the Cherokee Nation of Indians", V. O. King reports:

In 1822, a convention was made between the Cherokees and the Empire of Mexico, by which the Indians were permitted to occupy and cultivate certain lands in eastern Texas, in consideration of fealty and service in case of war. Neither the empire, however, nor its successor, the Republic of Mexico, would consent to part with their sovereignty in the soil, and persistently refused any other rights than those of domicile and tillage...

Enforcement of the 1822 agreement with Mexico was difficult, and on April 15, 1825, a white immigrant, Benjamin Edwards, was given a grant by the Mexican government to settle in Cherokee-claimed lands in east Texas. The dissatisfaction with the Mexican authorities found an outlet when a number of aggrieved white settlers in nearby Nacogdoches revolted against the Mexican government in what became known as the Fredonian Rebellion. While Fields, as red (or war) chief, and John Dunn Hunter, as white (or peace) chief, together opened negotiations with the Fredonian leaders, Di'wali urged the Cherokee not to cooperate with the rebels. He believed that loyalty to Mexico would lead to final enforcement of the 1822 treaty and recognition of the Cherokee land claims. Di'wali was convincing, and the Cherokee remained loyal to Mexico during the rebellion. Fields and Hunter were executed by the Mexican government on May 8, 1827, for their support of the Fredonian Rebellion, and Di'wali succeeded Fields as war chief.

== Attempts to secure land rights ==
In remaining loyal to Mexico, Stephen F. Austin and other Mexican officials praised Di'wali and the Cherokee in the wake of the Fredonian Rebellion. Di'wali was summoned to Nacogdoches and given a commission of lieutenant colonel in the Mexican Army on July 19, 1827. During this time, Di'wali continued to work toward securing a written guarantee of rights over the Cherokee lands from the Mexican government, but the Mexican government repeatedly withheld written agreement. By 1830, an estimated 800 Cherokee lived in up to seven settlements in Texas. They became known as the Texas Cherokee, or Tsalagiyi nvdagi.

When the Texas Revolution came, the Texas Cherokee decided to remain neutral, but Sam Houston ( who married Tiana Rogers, niece of Chief Di'wali) sought an alliance with the Cherokee. Seeking to give them what the Mexican government had refused and empowered under authority of the new government, General Houston negotiated a treaty with the Cherokee and other associated groups, granting over 2.5 million acres of land in east Texas:

Be It Solemnly Decreed, That we, the chosen delegates of the consultation of all Texas, in general convention assembled, solemnly declare, That the Cherokee Indians, and their associated bands, twelve tribes in number, agreeably to their late general council in Texas, have derived their just claims to lands included within the bounds hereinafter mentioned, from the government of Mexico, from whom we have also derived our rights to the soil by grant and occupancy. We solemnly declare, that the boundaries of the claims of said Indians to lands is as follows, to wit: lying north of the San Antonio road and the Neches, ask west of the Angeline and Sabine rivers. We solemnly declare, that the governor and general council, immediately on its organization, shall appoint commissioners to treat with said Indian, to establish the definite boundary of their territory, and secure their confidence and friendship. We solemnly declare, that we will guarantee to them peaceable enjoyment of their rights to their lands, as we do our own.

Given the prospect of finally having a secure homeland, the Cherokee agreed, and Di'wali signed the treaty on behalf of the Texas Cherokees near present-day Alto, Texas, on February 23, 1835. Consequently, the Texas Cherokee remained supportive of the Texans against Santa Anna. On December 20, 1836, within the first two months as president of the Republic of Texas, Sam Houston told the Texas Senate, I "most earnestly recommend [the treaty with the Cherokee]'s ratification. You will find upon examining this treaty, that it is just and equitable, and perhaps the best which could be made at present time." The senate of the Republic of Texas, however, refused to ratify the treaty, citing that the Cherokee had not actively fought with Texans in the revolution and that the treaty conflicted with a grant given to David G. Burnet. Over Houston's objections, the Senate formally nullified the treaty on December 16, 1837. Almost immediately, the Land Office began issuing patents to lands within the Cherokee lands.

Though the relations between the Texas Cherokee and the Republic of Texas were strained, Houston and Di'wali remained close friends, and Di'wali served—at Houston's request—as a representative of the Texas government in negotiations with the Comanche in the western plains. In a further attempt to secure permanent recognition of Indian lands in east Texas, Di'wali again looked to Mexico when Vicente Córdova attempted an insurgency against the Republic of Texas. The government of Mexico sought an arrangement with the Cherokee for their support in an insurgency in exchange for title to their land. Di'wali permitted Córdova's militia to operate within Cherokee lands in 1838. When a member of the Córdova militia had been killed in May 1839, documents were uncovered by Texas officials that suggested a conspiracy between the pro-Mexican forces and the Texas Cherokee. Though the Córdova Rebellion had been suppressed quickly, coming to a head in August 1838, the newly discovered documents led the new president of the Republic of Texas, Mirabeau Lamar, to make charges in December 1838 that Di'wali had surreptitiously collaborated with Córdova.

== Conflict with Texas Republic ==
In 1839, in his first formal address as president, Lamar urged that the Cherokee and Comanche tribes be driven from their lands in Texas, believing that the “total extinction" of the Indian tribes was necessary to make the lands available to whites. Lamar instructed the Texas military to construct a military post on the Great Sabine (in the southwest corner of present-day Smith County), with Di'wali warning that such a move would provoke a violent response. Lamar sent word that the Cherokee were to depart or suffer removal by force, but Di'wali was resolute that Texas should honor its 1836 treaty. John H. Reagan, an emissary of Lamar's administration, met with Di'wali in early July, delivering Lamar's charges and providing a few days for Di'wali to consult with his council.

Of the second meeting with Di'wali, Reagan writes:

The grave deportment of Chief Bowles indicated that he felt the seriousness of his situation. He [said] that there had been a meeting of the chiefs and head men in the council; that his young men were for war; that all who were in the council were for war, except himself and [White Chief] Big Mush; that his young men believed that they could whip the whites; that he knew the whites could ultimately whip them, but it would cost them ten years of bloody frontier war. He inquired of Mr. Lacy [the Indian agent] if action on the President's demand could not be postponed until his people could make and gather their crops. Mr. Lacy informed him that he had no authority or discretion beyond what was said in the communication from the President. The language of Chief Bowles indicated that he regarded this as settling the question, and that war must ensue ... He said that he had led his people a long time, and that he felt it to be his duty to stand by them, whatever fate might befall him.

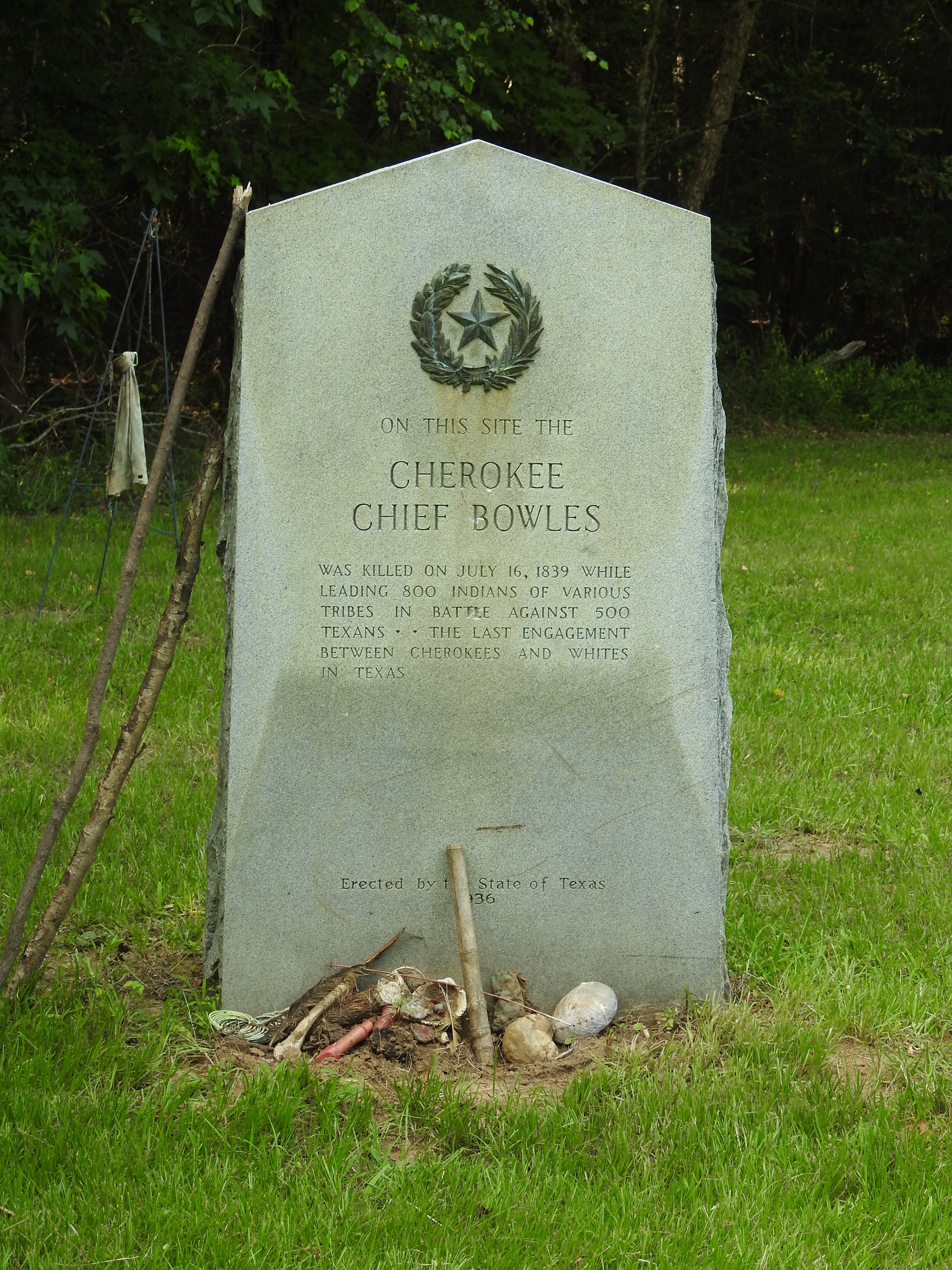
Historical marker erected by the State of Texas in 1936 where Chief Bowls was killed on July 16, 1839

== Final fight and last stand ==
On July 14 1839, Lamar sent troops, under the command of Gen. Thomas Rusk, to occupy the Indian territory. Fleeing their town and forced northward into present-day Van Zandt County, the Cherokee halted on July 15 and prepared defenses at the Neches River. On the morning of July 16, though severely outnumbered, Di'wali confronted his pursuers. Di'wali "exhorted the Indians to fight bravely. During the last battle he could be heard repeatedly encouraging them, and more than once urging them to charge." Eventually, with his troops depleted of ammunition, Di'wali ordered retreat, although he remained. Sitting on his horse, wearing a military hat and sword given to him by Sam Houston, Di'wali faced the advancing Texans. The Texan forces shot his horse and then injured the chief, shooting him in the thigh and the back. Unable to walk but raising himself to a sitting position on the ground, Di'wali was singing a war song when Captain Robert W. Smith approached Di'wali and shot him in the head. Smith then took the sword from Di'wali's body and swaths of skin from his arm as souvenir.

Of Di'wali, John H. Reagan recalls, "I had witnessed his dignity and manliness in council, his devotion to his tribe in sustaining their decision for war against his judgement, and his courage in battle." As he had requested, Di'wali was left on the battlefield according to tradition. A historical marker now stands at the site of Chief Di'wali 's death. A funeral for Di'wali was held by the descendants of the tribe in 1995, on the 156th anniversary of his death.

Preceded by Title nonexistent	Principal Chief of the Cherokee Nation West; 1810–1813	Succeeded by Degadoga
