= Lovely County, Arkansas Territory =

Former county of the Arkansas Territory

Lovely County was a county that existed from October 31, 1827, to 1828 in the Arkansas Territory.

It included all or part of present-day Benton, Washington, and Crawford counties in Arkansas plus all or part of present-day Delaware, Mayes, Wagoner, Cherokee, Adair, Sequoyah, and Muskogee counties in Oklahoma. If this county were to be revived today, it would comprise the western portions of Washington and Benton counties.

The county seat was Nicksville, established on April 25, 1828. The town was located on the west bank of Sallisaw Creek, thirteen miles (21 km) from its mouth. The town was named after General John Nicks, a hero of the War of 1812, and mostly consisted of log buildings.

The post office was discontinued on October 2, 1829, with the buildings of Nicksville being later purchased by Dwight Mission.

The county had three townships: Nicks, Hope, and Prospect.

The Osage and the Cherokee ceded most of the territory that would become Lovely County to the federal government in a forced exchange associated with the Indian Removal Act and relocation of these and other tribes to west of the Mississippi Rive.

This area was known as "Lovely's Purchase" (sometimes as the "Lovely Donations") after US Indian agent William Lovely. He had managed the transaction as part of a treaty which sought to establish a buffer zone between the warring Osage and Western Cherokee.

The land was described as being the

land along the Arkansas River at Fort Bayou; then up the Arkansas and Verdigris to the falls of the Verdigris river; thence eastward to the said Osage boundary line. at a point 20 leagues north from the Arkansas River; and with that line, to the point of beginning.

Arkansas Territory created Lovely County on October 13, 1827, from the land taken from Crawford County, and the Lovely Purchase. The new boundaries were described as follows:

Beginning at the upper Cherokee boundary line. on the north bank of the Arkansas river, thence running up and with the meanders of said river to the mouth of the Canadian fork, thence up said Canadian fork to the western limits of the territory of Arkansas, thence north with that line to the north-west corner of the territory, thence east to the south-west comer of Missouri, thence east with the line between Missouri and Arkansas, to the Fiery prairie or Brown's line, thence south with Brown's line to the Cherokee line, and thence with the Cherokee line to the place of beginning[.]

Those boundaries were short-lived. In 1828 the Cherokee Nation West ceded its lands in Arkansas Territory for lands in what became Indian Territory, in the Treaty of Washington. According to an act of congress dated May 24, 1828, all white families displaced in Lovely County were given two quarter sections of land elsewhere.

The rest of Lovely county became part of Washington County, Arkansas, on October 27, 1828, with county officials being directed to "take over the affairs and moneys of Lovely County."

The original records of Lovely County were believed to be lost, but were discovered in 1966 near Watts, Oklahoma. The records are now housed at the Gilcrease Museum in Tulsa, Oklahoma.
