= Dwight Presbyterian Mission =

Historic church in Oklahoma, United States

- Dwight Mission
- U.S. National Register of Historic Places
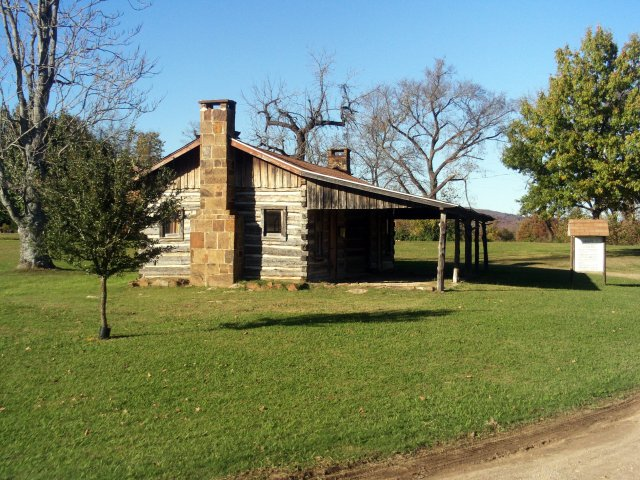

- Location within Oklahoma Location within the United States
- Nearest city: Marble City, Oklahoma
- Coordinates: 35°32′51″N 94°51′9″W
- Area: 10 acres (4.0 ha)
- Built: 1923
- NRHP reference No.: 73001570
- Added to NRHP: March 20, 1973

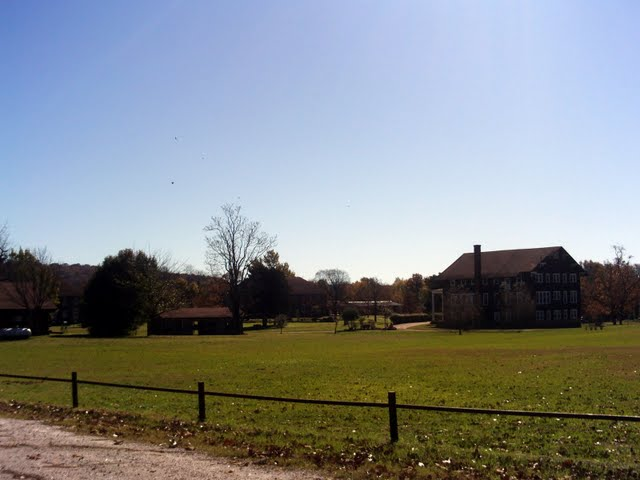

Dwight Presbyterian Mission was one of the first American missions to the Native Americans. It was established near present-day Russellville, Arkansas in 1820 to serve the Arkansas Cherokees. After the Cherokee were required to move to Indian Territory in 1828, the mission was reestablished in 1829 near present-day Marble City, Oklahoma. The mission is listed on the National Register of Historic Places.

== History ==
A mission was requested by Tahlonteeskee, the Principal Chief of the Western Cherokees, after he had visited Brainerd Mission in 1818. The mission was founded in August 1820 on Illinois Bayou near present-day Russellville, Arkansas by Cephas Washburn. It was named for Rev. Timothy Dwight, president of Yale College and a corporate member of the American Board of Commissioners for Foreign Missions. After Tahlonteeskee's death in the spring of 1819, the mission was supported by his brother John Jolly.

By 1824, Dwight Mission was a self-contained small town on the frontier. There were at least 24 buildings, including residences for missionaries, students, staff, and visitors; support buildings that included a combination library, post office and pharmacy; a dining hall with kitchen; a storehouse; a blacksmith shop; lathe and carpenter shop; a stable and a barn.

A new treaty between the Cherokees and the United States in 1828 required the Arkansas Cherokees to move to Indian Territory. Therefore, the mission was reestablished in its present-day location, in May 1829, on Sallisaw Creek, near the city of Marble City, Oklahoma. The school opened May 1, 1830. Initially, the facility had a double log house (a building combining school and living quarters) and several log houses to house the staff. Eventually, there would be twenty-one houses, a dining hall, a barn and a number of outbuildings. The mission had more than a dozen staff members and eighty students at the peak of its activity. Its primary mission was to provide an education to Cherokee children and expose them to the Christian religion.

Samuel Worcester served at the mission in 1835, after having worked with the Cherokee as a missionary in Georgia before removal. He created the type for the Cherokee syllabary for their first newspaper, the Cherokee Phoenix. In 1837, the first Cherokee language printing press in the then Indian Territory (now Oklahoma) was moved from Union Mission to Dwight Mission. In 1839, the majority of the Cherokee nation was removed to the area from the Southeast on the Trail of Tears.

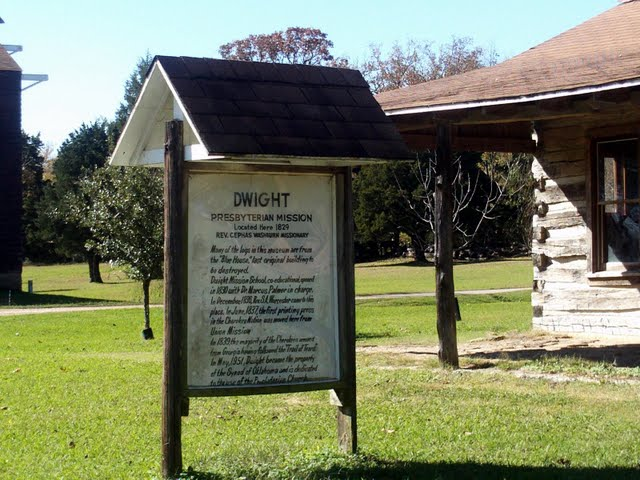

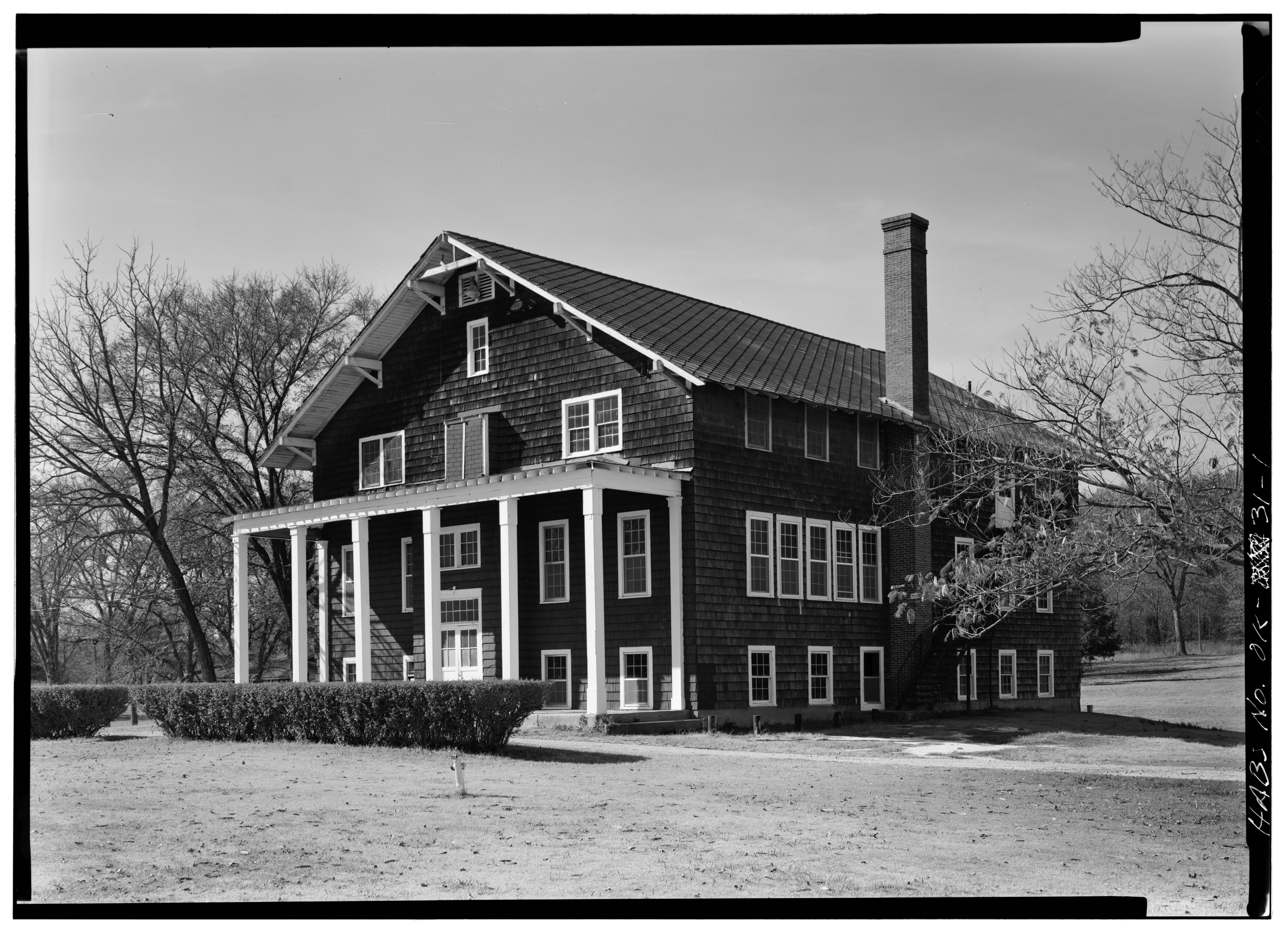

During the American Civil War, many of the mission's buildings were burned down in warfare between pro-Confederate and pro-Union forces. The last religious service was in November 1862. Then it was abandoned. Afterwards, the property was taken over by private owners. By 1884, only two of the original buildings remained.

The Cherokee National Council decided to reopen the school in 1886. The Presbyterian Women's Board of Home Missions supplied funds to do this, and a large building was constructed to serve as a boarding school for Cherokee girls. After 1895, it became a day school, then resumed the boarding school concept in 1900, this time for boys and girls.

On January 12, 1918, a fire burned the Dwight Mission School dormitory, destroying the dormitory and killing thirteen students. The students were named as: George Wickett (Cherokee), Nighthawk Mclemore (Cherokee), Phillip Correll (Cherokee), Rufus Young (Cherokee), J. P. Chandler, Jr (Cherokee), Kenneth Crutchfield (Cherokee), Delbert Barnes (Cherokee), Wilson Beaver (Creek), George Tiger (Creek), Robert Daniels (Creek), Solomon Bruner (Creek), Newton Goins (Choctaw), and Gilbert Grants (Omaha). The boys, who were aged 9 to 17, were trapped on a screened porch. Their bodies were returned to their hometowns, and a memorial for them was erected in the Dwight Mission Cemetery.

By 1944, the facility was called Dwight Indian Training School. It was then operated by Board of National Missions of the Presbyterian Church USA, and served seventy-one students, mostly Cherokee and Choctaw.

The school was closed in 1948.

In the fall of 1950, a number of Presbyterian laymen felt that the Synod of Oklahoma should acquire the property and preserve it because of its long association with the Presbyterian Church. They formed Dwight Mission, Inc. and purchased the property on May 6, 1951, for $35,000. Dwight Mission, Inc. and the Synod of Oklahoma managed the daily programs for the next 30 years.

Dwight Mission today operates as a Presbyterian camp, retreat, and conference center between Marble City and Sallisaw, Oklahoma. It is listed on the National Register of Historic Places. Historical markers identify and explain the original location in Arkansas.

In June 2021, Dwight Mission was acquired by the Cherokee Nation.
