= Tahlonteeskee (Cherokee chief) =

Cherokee chief (c. 1760–c. 1819)

Tahlonteeskee (Note: Also spelled Talotisky, Tale'danigi'ski) (Cherokee: ᏓᎶᎥᏗᏍᎩ, romanized: Dalonvdisgi; c. 1760 - c. 1819) was a Cherokee headman of Cayuga town, eventually rising to Principal Chief of the first Cherokee Nation. He was one of the "Old Settlers" of the Cherokee Nation—West, and the namesake of the first capital city of the Cherokee in Indian Territory.

== Early life ==
Tahlonteeskee was the older brother (or possibly a half-brother) of John Jolly. He married Jennie Lowrey, sister of Chief George Lowrey. (Note: Lowery may have been a cousin of Sequoyah. Lowery's wife was Lucy Benge, a half-sister of Sequoyah. Lucy was the sister of Chickamauga warrior, Bob Benge (often referred to as 'Captain' Bench), whose cousin was John Watts.)

As nephews of the First Beloved Man of the Overhill Cherokee, the Old Tassel, both Tahlonteeskee and John Watts (or 'Young Tassel') accompanied Young Dragging Canoe (Note: Son of Dragging Canoe, who had recently died.) when he was invited to the Spanish port of Pensacola to parlay with the governor of Spanish Florida, Oneal. This meeting was for the purpose of gaining Spanish supplied arms and ammunition in order to better fight the encroachment on their lands by frontiersman from the expanding United States. They returned to the Chickamauga head-town and Watts' center of operations, Willstown, with ten pack-mules loaded with war supplies. With these arms in hand, Watts called the chiefs together to plan a war of extinction against the Overmountain towns of Tennessee.

Although originally planning to take part in the late September 1792 raids into the Mero District of Central Tennessee, Tahlonteeskee's raiding party was sent east—into the Washington District instead. He thus avoided the route suffered by Watts' combined Cherokee, Creek, and Shawnee force at Buchanan's Station outside Nashboro.

== Name variances ==
According to the Cherokee genealogist, Dr. Emmet Starr, the alternative spelling of his name, "Talotisky" or "Talotiskee" was possibly an alliterative spelling of Tahlonteeskee (since at that time there was not yet a uniform system of writing Cherokee sounds into English). (Note: The Cherokee embraced the matrilineal clan system, in which uncle-nephew connections were more important than father-son relationships.)

== Tribal politics ==
At the time of the establishment of the original Cherokee Nation, Tahlonteeskee was a Cherokee headman of Cayuga town (or Cayoka), on Hiawassee Island (in modern-day Hamilton County, Tennessee). Following the decision he and Chief Doublehead made to sign over large parcels of traditional Cherokee hunting grounds to the United States in 1805, they found themselves considered by many Cherokee to be traitors. After Doublehead was assassinated in 1807 for his part in the land transfer, Tahlonteeskee emigrated into the west (in 1809), and became one of the first of the "Old Settlers" of the new Cherokee Nation—West then being established in the Arkansas Territory.

Tahlonteeskee became the third Principal Chief of the Cherokee Nation—West in 1817 (succeeding Takatoka), and served until his death in 1819, when he in turn was succeeded by his brother, John Jolly (Oolooteka). Tahlonteeskee was the first western chief to allow Christianity to be taught to the Cherokee, and permitted missionaries to establish the original Dwight Mission in the Nation's western holdings known as Lovely's Purchase in the Arkansas territory, before the Federal Government forced the Old Settlers even further west, into the area of the future Indian Territory.

== Namesake ==
Tahlonteeskee, Oklahoma, the first capital city of the early Western Cherokee Nation, was named for him. The town acted in that capacity from 1828 through 1839, when the new capitol building was completed in Tahlequah, Oklahoma, and the seat of government moved there. Tahlonteeskee was the oldest governmental capital established in Oklahoma.

== Notes ==
Preceded by Takatoka	Principal Chief of the Cherokee Nation–West; 1817–1819	Succeeded by John Jolly
