= Chickamauga Cherokee =

Group of Cherokee who separated from the larger tribe

The Chickamauga Cherokee (also known as Chickamuagans) are a Native American group who separated from the Cherokee in March 1775 (at the beginning of the American Revolutionary War) to the early 1800s, when elderly chiefs sold more than 22 million square acres of their hunting grounds. Most of the Cherokee people who lived on the Atlantic seaboard surrounded by settlers signed peace treaties with the Americans in 1776-1777, after the Second Cherokee War. Followers of the Skiagusta (war chief) Dragging Canoe who lived on the landward side of the Appalachian continental divide in proximity to Muscogees (formerly known as Creeks) moved with him down the Tennessee River, away from their historic Overhill Cherokee towns. Relocated to a more isolated area, they established 11 new towns to distance themselves from encroaching colonists.

While frontier Americans associated Dragging Canoe and his band with their new town on Chickamauga Creek, and began to refer to the band as the Chickamaugas, Wilma Mankiller, former Principal Chief of the Cherokee Nation, referred to them as Chickamaugans, rather than Chickamaugas. The Chickamauga moved further west and southwest into present-day Alabama five years later, establishing five larger settlements. They were then more commonly known as the Lower Cherokee, a term closely associated with the people of the five lower towns.

Dragging Canoe, the first Chickamaugan chief, separated from the Upper Cherokee and accused the elderly chiefs of endangering the survival of their people. He never met with whites to negotiate a treaty again.

== Black Jack and British loyalists ==
Dragging Canoe was a beacon of resistance to First Nations. Shawnees, Muscogees, and exiles from many other First Nations soon joined him. In 1772, four years before the beginning of the American Revolution, Lord Chief Justice Mansfield ruled that slaves could not be held against their will in Britain. Many slaves simply walked away from their owners and masters. Word spread in the American colonies. While plantation and slave owners panicked in the American colonies, hundreds of slaves tried to make their way to the coast for ships sailing to Britain. Slaves too far from the coast headed for First Nations instead. Black Jack, a former slave, became Dragging Canoe’s trusted interpreter and spy. Nickajack was named in honor of “Nigger Jack”.

Likewise, twenty percent of the population in the American colonies did not want to exchange an absolute ruler, who was absent, for an aristocracy of rulers already living there. One fifth of the population was firmly set against the rebels or the patriots. Many British loyalists joined loyalist units in their fight against the rebels before making their way to First Nations. Mitchell Sanders/Saunders was a Revolutionary War deserter from New Hampshire and the father of Alexander Sanders/Saunders and his well-known Cherokee siblings. Both William Childers and William Perdew deserted from the same loyalist unit in July 1779. Theda Perdue, born in 1949 in McRae, Georgia and a possible descendant, is the author of numerous books related to Cherokee history: Cherokee removal: a brief history with documents; ‘Mixed blood’ Indians: racial construction in the early south; Cherokee women, gender and culture change. Hundreds of names of British loyalists appear in Emmet Starr's History of the Cherokee Indians genealogical section between pages 303 and 466.

== Migration ==
=== Chickamauga towns ===
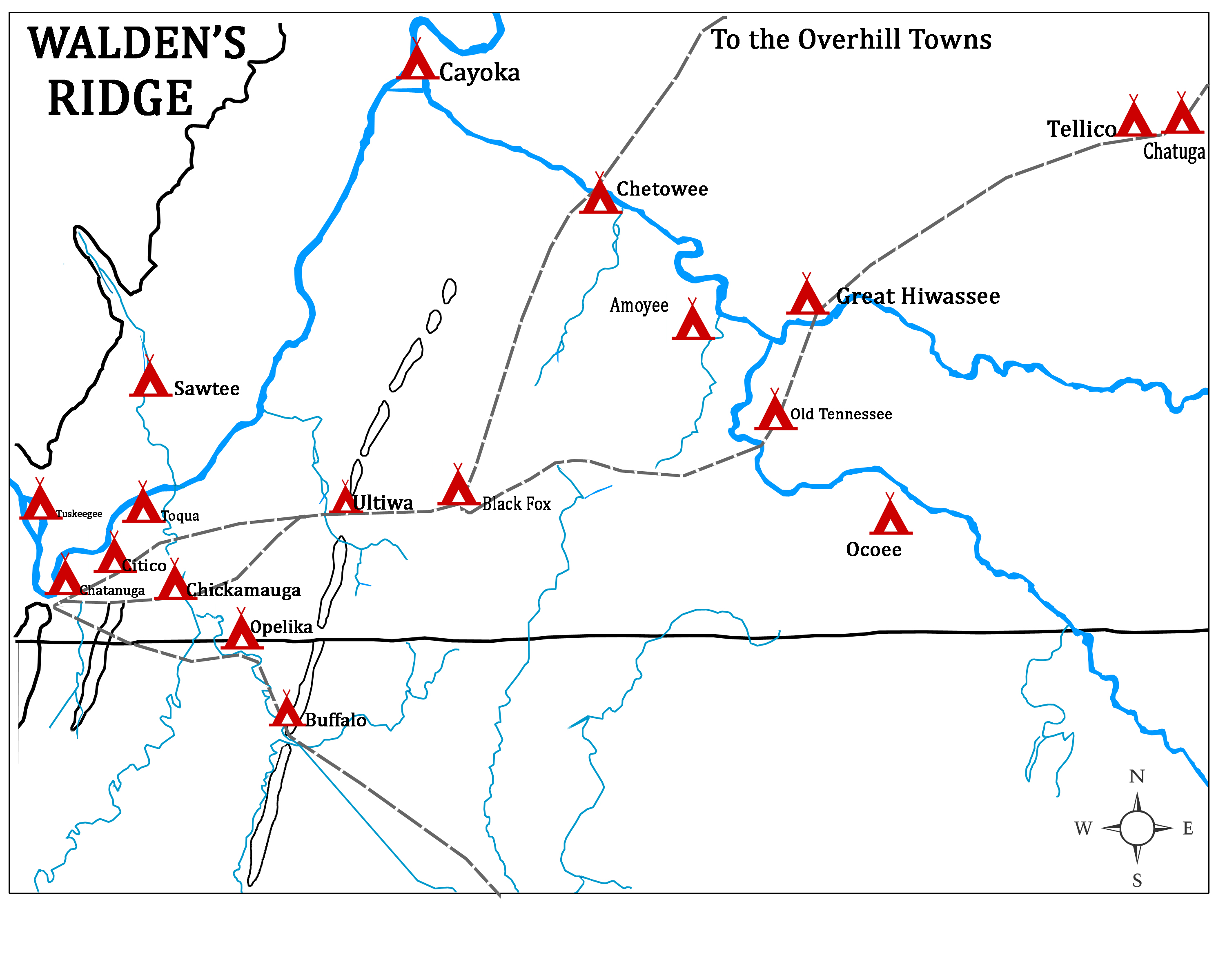
The original Chickamauga towns of Dragging Canoe's followers, with Hiwassee towns and towns on the Tellico

During the winter of 1776–77, the Cherokee followers of Dragging Canoe moved down the Tennessee River and away from their Overhill Cherokee towns. They established nearly a dozen towns in this area to distance themselves from European-American encroachment.

Dragging Canoe and his followers settled where the Great Indian Warpath crossed Chickamauga Creek, near present-day Chattanooga, Tennessee. They named their town "Chickamauga", after the creek, and the adjacent region was known as the Chickamauga area. American settlers referred to its militant Cherokee as "Chickamaugas." Among the Native American Confederacy "Chickamauga" was a derogatory word, signaling persons no longer included, outsiders, and has been used throughout history where dissension and conflict led to political divisions.

In 1782, militias under John Sevier and William Campbell destroyed the eleven Cherokee towns. Dragging Canoe led his people further down the Tennessee River, establishing five Lower Cherokee towns. After the Revolutionary War, westward migration increased from the new states of Virginia, North Carolina, South Carolina, and Georgia.

=== Five Lower Towns ===
In April 1779 Evan Shelby and troops from Virginia and North Carolina destroyed Chickamaugan towns. As Dragging Canoe had many Muscogee followers and supporters, he sent his brother, Little Owl, to request permission from Muscogee chief Alexander McGillivray to live on Muscogee land. McGillivray gladly gave his consent and Dragging Canoe and his followers then established five new towns in Muscogee territory. The towns centered on Running Water Creek Whiteside, Tennessee. The other towns founded at this time were Nickajack (near the cave of the same name), Long Island (on the Tennessee River), Crow Town (at the mouth of Crow Creek), and Lookout Mountain (Lookout Mountain Town, present-day Trenton, Georgia). A sixth town was added later, founded by red-headed "half-breed" chief, Will Webber (Willstown). The Chickamauga towns on the landward side of the Appalachian continental divide were known as the Lower Towns while the Cherokee majority who lived on the Atlantic seaboard were known as the Upper Cherokee.

Division among the Cherokee is indicated by a May 4, 1808 letter from Thomas Jefferson to the "Chiefs of the Upper Cherokee" in which he says, "You propose My Children, that your Nation shall be divided into two and that your part the Upper Cherokees, shall be separated from the lower by a fixed boundary, shall be placed under the Government of the U.S. become citizens thereof, and be ruled by our laws; in fine, to be our brothers instead of our children."

== Warfare ==
The Chickamauga Cherokee became known for their uncompromising enmity with United States settlers who pushed them out of their traditional territory. They signed treaties with Great Britain and Spain. From the town of Running Water, Dragging Canoe led attacks on white settlements throughout the American Southeast.

The Lower Cherokee and the frontiersmen were at war until 1794. Chickamauga warriors raided as far as Indiana, Kentucky, and Virginia with members of the Northwestern Confederacy, which they helped establish). Because of a growing belief in the Chickamauga cause and US destruction of homes of other Native Americans, most of the Cherokee became allied against the United States.

After the 1792 death of Dragging Canoe, his hand-picked successor John Watts "Young Tassel" assumed control of the Lower Cherokee. Under Watts's lead, the Cherokee continued their policy of Indian unity and hostility toward European Americans. Watts moved his base of operations to Willstown to be closer to his Muscogee allies, and had concluded a treaty in Pensacola with Spanish West Florida governor Arturo O'Neill de Tyrone for arms and supplies to continue the war.

== Cherokee interactions ==
The Chickamauga and later Lower Towns were no different from the rest of the Cherokee than other groups of settlements known as the Middle Towns, Out Towns, (original) Lower Towns, Valley Towns, or Overhill Towns, which were established along the Appalachian Mountains by the time of European contact. The groupings were geographic rather than political, and residents of the Overhill and Valley Towns spoke a similar dialect. The people based their government in the clan and town, and townhouses were built for communal gatherings. Some of the towns were associated with smaller nearby villages, and regional councils had no binding powers.

The groups of towns developed differing ideas about relations with European Americans, partially based on interaction, intermarriage, and trading and other partnerships. While Cherokees on the Atlantic seaboard were surrounded by settlers and began to adapt to farming, Chickamaugans lived among Muscogees and on Muscogee land. The only Cherokee "national" role before 1788 was that of First Beloved Man, a chief negotiator from the towns most isolated from European settlers. The Cherokee established a national council after that year, but it met irregularly and had little authority.

Dragging Canoe addressed the national council at Ustanali and acknowledged Little Turkey as his successor; he was memorialized by the council after his death in 1792. Chickamauga leaders frequently communicated with the Cherokee from other regions. They were supported in warfare against the colonists and later pioneers by warriors from the Overhill Towns. A number of Chickamauga chiefs signed treaties with the federal government, along with other Cherokee Nation leaders.

== Aftermath of the wars ==
After the Treaty of Tellico Blockhouse in late 1794, leaders of the Lower Cherokee dominated national tribal affairs. When the national government of the Cherokee Nation was organized, the first three people to hold the office of Principal Chief were Little Turkey (1788–1801), Black Fox (1801–1811), and Pathkiller (1811–1827). All three had been warriors under Dragging Canoe. Doublehead and Turtle-at-Home, the first two speakers of the Cherokee National Council, had also served with Dragging Canoe. Domination of the Cherokee by former warriors from the Lower Towns continued well into the 19th century; after the revolt of the young Upper Towns chiefs (who had also served with Dragging Canoe and John Watts), representatives of the Lower Towns remained a major voice.

=== Resettlement ===
Many former warriors returned to the original settlements in the Chickamauga area, some of which had been reoccupied. They also established new towns in the area and several in north Georgia. Others moved into towns which were established after the earlier migration.

Brother Steiner, a representative of the Moravian Brethren, met with Lower Cherokee former warrior Richard Fields in 1799 at Tellico Blockhouse. Steiner hired him as guide and interpreter, since he had been sent south by the Brethren to find an appropriate location for a mission and school in Cherokee territory. It was found at Spring Place on land donated by James Vann, who supported a European-American education for his people. When Steiner asked Fields, "What kind of people are the Chickamauga?" the guide laughed and replied, "They are Cherokee, and we know no difference." Neither the Chickamauga nor other Cherokee considered them distinct from the 18th-century Cherokee.

Others joined the remnant populations from the former Overhill towns on the Little Tennessee River known as the Upper Towns, centered on Ustanali in Georgia. Vann and his protégés, The Ridge and Charles R. Hicks, became leaders. They were the most progressive of the Cherokee, favoring acculturation, formal European-American education, and modern agricultural methods.

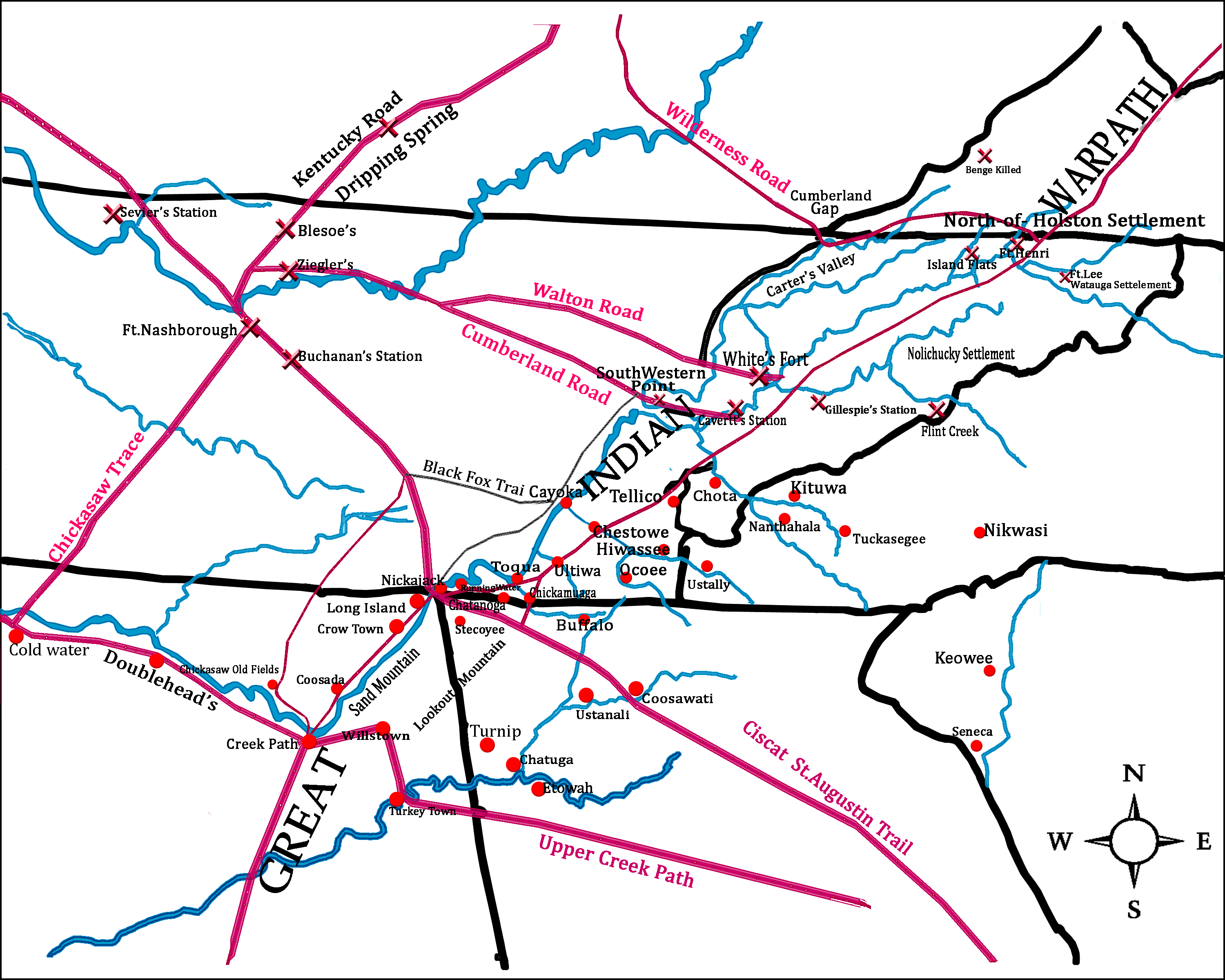
The primary area of operations during the Chickamauga Wars, with the war's more prominent settlements; the postwar Lower Towns are in the lower left quarter.

For a decade or more after the end of hostilities, the northern section of the Upper Towns had its own council and acknowledged the chief of the Overhill Towns as its leader. They moved south after ceding their land to the United States.

John McDonald returned to his home on the Chickamauga River, across from Old Chickamauga Town, and lived there until he sold it in 1816. It was purchased by the Boston-based American Board of Commissioners for Foreign Missions for use as the Brainerd Mission, which served as a church (the Baptist Church of Christ at Chickamauga) and a school with academic and vocational training. His daughter, Mollie McDonald, and son-in-law Daniel Ross developed a farm and trading post near the old village of Chatanuga (Tsatanugi) in the early days of the wars. Settled near them were sons Lewis and Andrew Ross and a number of daughters. Their son John Ross, born in Turkey Town, became a principal chief who guiding the Cherokee through the 1830s Indian removal and relocation to Indian Territory west of the Mississippi River.

Most of the Lower Cherokee remained in the towns they inhabited in 1794 (known as the Lower Towns), with their seat at Willstown. Former Lower Towns warriors dominated Cherokee political affairs for the next twenty years. They were more conservative than the Upper Towns leaders, assimilating but keeping as many old ways as possible.

The Lower Towns were roughly south and southwest of the Hiwassee River, along the Tennessee to the north border of the Muscogee nation, and west of the Conasauga and the Ustanali in Georgia. The Upper Towns were north and east of the Hiwassee, between the Chattahoochee River and the Conasauga, about the same area as the later Amohee, Chickamauga, and Chattooga districts of the eastern Cherokee Nation.

Traditional Cherokee settlements in the highlands of western North Carolina became known as the Hill Towns, with their seat at Quallatown. The lowland Valley Towns, with their seat at Tuskquitee, were more traditional; so was the Upper Town of Etowah, inhabited primarily by full-bloods (many Cherokee in other towns were of mixed race but identified as Cherokee) and the nation's largest town. The Overhill towns along the Little Tennessee remained more or less autonomous, and kept their seat at Chota.

=== Lower Towns leaders ===
John Watts "Young Tassel" remained head of the Lower Cherokee council at Willstown until his death in 1808. Doublehead, already a member of the triumvirate, then moved into that position and held it until his assassination in 1807. The younger brother of John Watts "Young Tassel", John Watts "Di'wali" Bowles applied for a passport from Spain in 1794 to take 400 Chickamauga tribesmen west of the Mississippi River, settling along the St. Francis River. The group included Creek, Cherokee, Shawnee, Chickasaw among others who adhered to the political position of resisting the colonists.

On orders from the Cherokee National Council, James Vann, Alexander Sanders/Saunders, and Major Ridge planned to kill Doublehead on the appointed day. James Vann was sick, so Sanders and Ridge and two clan relatives of Bone-Polisher (whom Doublehead had killed earlier) killed Doublehead.

John Rogers was succeeded on the council by the Glass, who was also assistant principal chief of the nation under Black Fox. The Glass was head of the Lower Towns' council until the unification council of 1810.

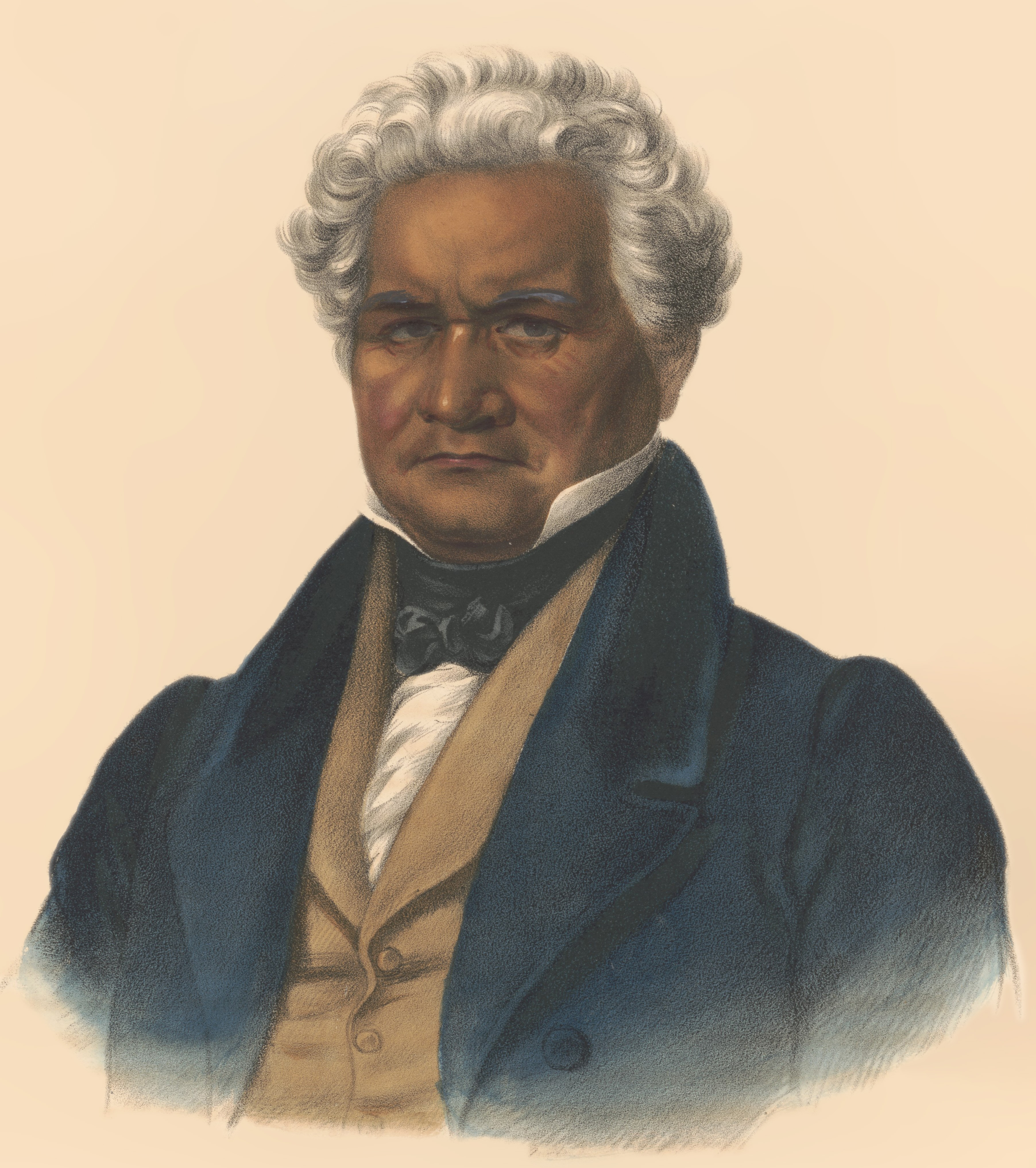
The Ridge (Ganundalegi), formerly known as Pathkiller (Nunnehidihi), in an illustration from History of the Indian Tribes of North America

By the time John Norton (a Mohawk of Cherokee and Scottish ancestry) visited the area in 1809–1810, some of the formerly-militant Cherokee of the Lower Towns had become the most assimilated. James Vann became a major planter, holding more than 100 African-American slaves, and was one of the wealthiest men east of the Mississippi. Norton became a friend of Turtle-at-Home, John Walker, Jr. and the Glass, all of whom were involved in business and commerce. At the time of Norton's visit, Turtle-at-Home owned a ferry and landing on the Federal Road between Nashville, Tennessee and Athens, Georgia (where he lived at Nickajack).

When Georgia and the US government increased pressure on the Cherokee Nation to cede its lands and move west of the Mississippi River, Lower Towns leaders such as Tahlonteeskee, Degadoga, John Jolly, Richard Fields, John Brown, Bob McLemore, John Rogers, Young Dragging Canoe, George Guess (Tsiskwaya, or Sequoyah) and Tatsi (also known as Captain Dutch) were forerunners. Believing that removal was inevitable in the face of settler greed, they wanted to get the best lands and settlements possible. They moved with their followers to Arkansas Territory, establishing what became known as the Cherokee Nation West. They then moved to Indian Territory after an 1828 treaty between their leaders and the US government. They were called the Old Settlers in Indian Territory, living there for nearly a decade before the rest of the Cherokee were forced to join them.

The remaining Lower Towns leaders also strongly advocated voluntary westward emigration, bitterly opposed by the former warriors and their sons who led the Upper Towns. Major Ridge (as the Ridge had been known since his military service during the Creek and First Seminole Wars), his son John Ridge, and his nephews Elias Boudinot and Stand Watie came to believe that they needed to negotiate the best deal with the federal government in the face of removal. Other emigration advocates were John Walker, Jr., David Vann, and Andrew Ross (brother of principal chief John Ross).

Taking advantage of negotiations after the Creek War, a small group of negotiators selected by American forces and headed by Major Ridge signed the Treaty of New Echota on December 29, 1835. The delegation was not authorized by the Cherokee government to sign treaties on behalf of the nation, however, and the treaty was seen by the people as illegal.

== Later events ==
=== Tecumseh’s Cherokee Daughter ===
Historical records indicate that Tecumseh and his brother, Cheeseekau, also known as Shawnee Warrior, had lived with the Chickamaugans and participated in multitribal attacks on white settlements with them from 1790 to 1792.

According to Tecumseh’s boyhood companion, Stephen Ruddell, captured with his brother, Abraham, as boys in 1780 in Kentucky and raised by the Shawnees, Tecumseh never had more than a one wife at a time. His longest relationship was with a Cherokee woman. They had a daughter who remained with her mother and was living in Arkansas in 1825.

The following century Tecumseh was said to be the grandfather of four or five brave and intelligent Cherokees known as the ‘fair-skinned’ Proctors”.

In the 1800s Lyman C. Draper attempted to eke out information about possible Cherokee descendants of Tecumseh. He wrote to both Will P. Ross at Fort Gibson, and J.T. Adair of Oak Grove. Will P. Ross replied

“I have not learned anything of the Cherokee woman, Tahneh [who was said to be the mother of a daughter by Tecumseh], beyond the fact that a person of that name resided in the neighborhood of Mrs. Looney.

Adair advised him to ask Ezekial “Zeke” Proctor for further information about his connection to Tecumseh. Draper did write to Ezekial Proctor, but there is no indication that Proctor ever answered him.

Missionary records indicate that Tahneh [said to be the mother of Tecumseh’s daughter] was the full blood daughter of a major chief and warrior of Will’s Valley. She migrated to the west in 1818. She was baptized on 5 September 1824 when she was about 64 years old and given the name Naomi. She lived near Mrs. Looney (daughter of Will Webber of Will’s Valley and Tsa-luh, later known as Sarah Brown) in Arkansas and was a member of the church at Fairfield where Alexander Brown (stepbrother of Betsy Webber Looney) interpreted. One of Tahneh’s daughters joined the Fairfield church.

While some of Tecumseh’s alleged Proctor descendants remained in the Cherokee Nation, it appears that descendants of Elizabeth Victoria Shelton, granddaughter of Johnson Proctor who was murdered at the Goingsnake Courthouse in 1872 defending his brother, Ezekial “Zeke,” made their way west and were living in California in the first half of the twentieth century.

=== Tecumseh's return ===
In November 1811, the Shawnee chief Tecumseh returned to the South in the hope of support from the southern tribes for his crusade to drive back the Americans and revive the old ways. He was accompanied by representatives of the Shawnee, Muscogee, Kickapoo, and Sioux peoples. Tecumseh's exhortations in the Chickasaw, Choctaw and Lower Muscogee towns found no traction, but he attracted some support from younger Upper Muscogee warriors.

The Cherokee delegation under the Ridge, who visited Tecumseh's council at Tuckabatchee, strongly opposed his plans; Tecumseh cancelled his visit to the Cherokee Nation because the Ridge threatened him with death if he went there. Tecumseh was escorted on his recruiting tour by 47 Cherokee and 19 Choctaw, however, who presumably went north with him when he returned to the Northwest Territory.

=== War with the Creek ===
Tecumseh's mission sparked a religious revival, referred to by anthropologist James Mooney as the "Cherokee Ghost Dance" movement. It was led by Tsali of Coosawatee, a former Chickamauga warrior. He later moved to the western North Carolina mountains, where he was executed by U.S. forces in 1838 for violently resisting removal.

Tsali met with the national council at Ustanali, arguing for war against the Americans. He moved some leaders until the Ridge was more persuasive in rebuttal, calling for support of the Americans in the coming war with the British and Tecumseh's alliance. During the War of 1812, William McIntosh of the Lower Muscogee sought Cherokee help in the Creek War to suppress the Red Sticks (Upper Muscogee). More than 500 Cherokee warriors served under Andrew Jackson against their former allies.

A few years later, Major Ridge led a troop of Cherokee cavalry who were attached to the 1,400-strong contingent of Lower Muscogee warriors under William McIntosh in the First Seminole War in Florida. They were allied with, and accompanied, a force of U.S. regular Army, Georgia militia, and Tennessee volunteers into Florida for action against the Seminoles, refugee Red Sticks, and escaped slaves fighting against the United States.

Warriors from the Cherokee Nation East traveled to the Old Settlers lands (or Cherokee Nation West) in Arkansas Territory to assist them during the Cherokee-Osage War of 1817–1823. Cherokee warriors (with only one exception) did not take to the warpath in the Southeast again from the end of the Seminole War to the American Civil War, when William Holland Thomas raised the Thomas Legion of Cherokee Indians and Highlanders in North Carolina to fight for the Confederacy.

The state of Georgia seized land in its south in 1830 which had belonged to the Cherokee since the end of the Creek War (land separated from the rest of the Cherokee Nation by a large section of Georgia territory), and began to parcel it out to settlers. Major Ridge led a party of 30 south; they drove the settlers out of their homes on what the Cherokee considered their land and burned the buildings to the ground, but harmed no one.

== Modern claimants ==
Several organizations claim to be the descendants of the Chickamauga, using the label Chickamauga as a self-identification; resulting in many unsubstantiated claimants in official American records. The Sac River/White River Bands of Chickamauga Cherokee Nation Inc. claim lineage from the Cherokee Gardner Green, however Cherokee genealogist Twila Barnes states that all of his descendants are known, and not present within the Bands. A member of the bands appealed the Oklahoma Supreme Court, arguing the state of Oklahoma lacked jurisdiction to prosecute him due to his membership, but his appeal was rejected. A group in Arkansas has started the Chickamauga Nation with claims they are not Cherokee and are a separate indigenous group altogether. DNA research indicates most are of non indigenous lineage and the group is not recognized by any legitimate association within the state or tribal communities.
