= John Jolly =

Cherokee leader (died 1838)

- Ahuludegi
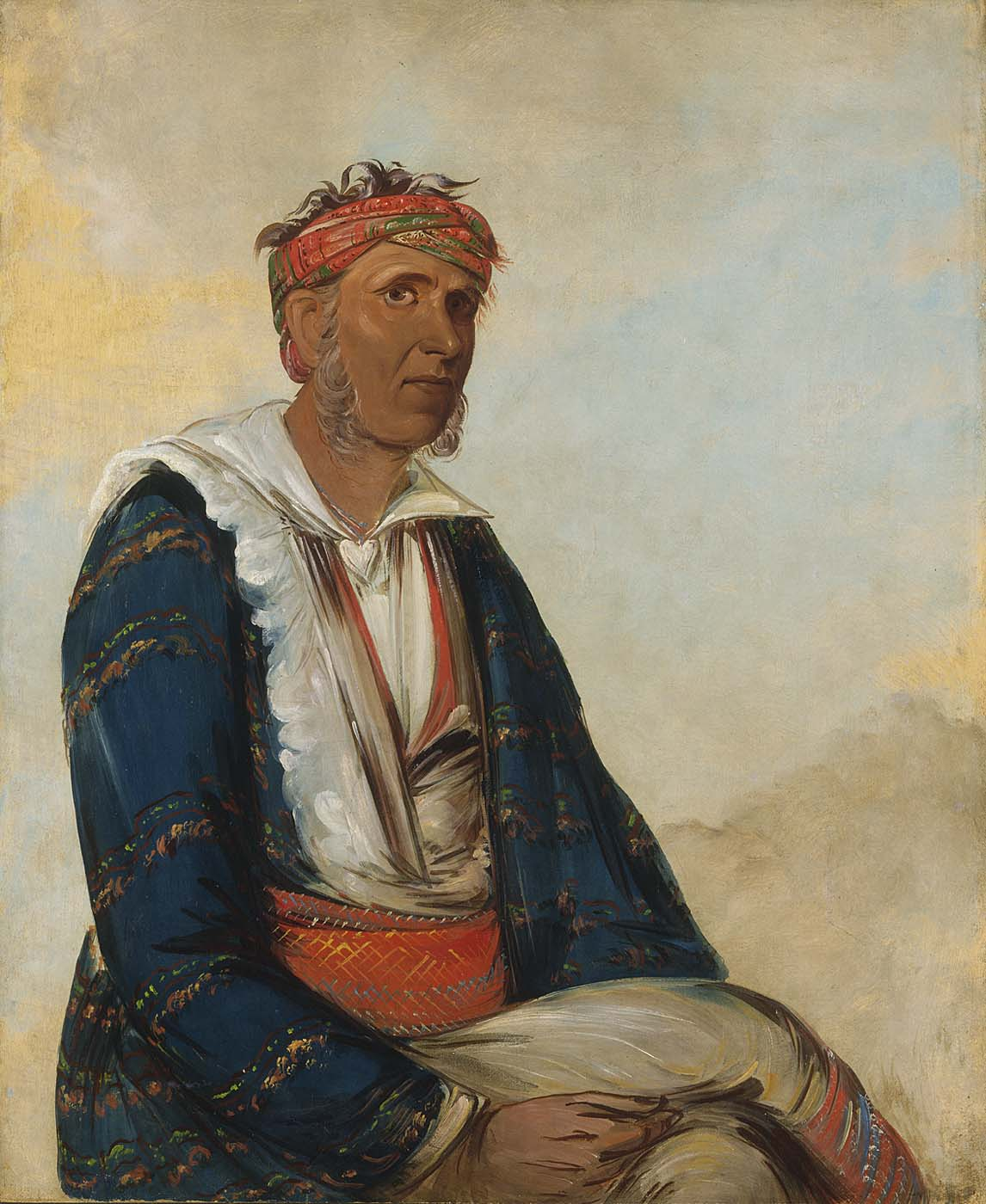
- Ahuludegi, also known as John Jolly; oil on canvas by George Catlin, 1834

Cherokee Nation–West leader
- Preceded by: Tahlonteeskee
- Succeeded by: John Looney

Personal details
- Born: c. 1769
- Died: 1838 Webbers Falls, Oklahoma
- Relations: Brother, Tahlonteeskee; Sister, Jenny Due; Nephews, John Rogers, John Rogers Jr.; Niece, Tiana Rogers, (wife of Sam Houston)
- Known for: Cherokee Leadership; first leader of the Old Settlers

John Jolly (Cherokee: Ahuludegi; also known as Oolooteka) was a leader of the Cherokee in Tennessee, the Arkansas district of the Missouri Territory, and Indian Territory (now Oklahoma). After a reorganization of the tribal government around 1818, he was made Principal Chief of the Cherokee Nation–West. Jolly was a wealthy slave-owning planter, cow rancher, and merchant. In many ways, he lived the life of a Southern planter.

== Tennessee ==
John Jolly was born around 1769, into a mixed-race family in Tennessee. He had a successful trading post on Hiwassee Island (in present-day Meigs County) in Eastern Tennessee. The island was located at the confluence of the Tennessee and Hiwassee Rivers.

Jolly was also a wealthy planter. He dressed in buckskin hunting shirts, leggings, and moccasins". He was a friendly and low-key person who was dedicated to providing the Cherokee people opportunities to thrive, including the use of technology and formal education. Jolly did not speak English, but likely understood it as well as other tribal languages and French. He led the plantation group of Cherokee originating in Tennessee after his brother Tahlonteeskee's departure for 'the west' in 1809. His brother, one of the first 'Old Settlers' of the western Cherokee, moved after the United States' acquisition of the Louisiana Purchase.

=== Adoption of Sam Houston ===
Sam Houston first met Jolly when he was a teenager. Houston had left his family in Maryville, Tennessee and come to live with the Cherokee on Hiwassee Island in 1809. He was taken in by Jolly, who treated him like a son. Jolly adopted him and acted as his father in the Cherokee Nation. Jolly gave Houston the Cherokee name of Ka'lanu, meaning 'the Raven'. He became an emissary for the Cherokee and helped negotiate treaties, and—eventually—their removal to the west. Houston later returned to his family in Maryville, Tennessee, but he lived once again with the Cherokee in the west in 1829. Jolly was a source of refuge for Houston after his ill-fated marriage to Eliza Allen.

== Arkansas Territory ==
His brother settled with tribe members in what was then Southern Missouri Territory. After a treaty in 1817, Tahlonteeskee (or Talontiski) and his followers moved to western Arkansas, along the Arkansas River at the mouth of the Poteau River. They were given an equal amount of land to what they had owned east of the Mississippi River. The Cherokee lands were located north of the Arkansas River, in the area designated as Lovely's Purchase. The rights of the Cherokee people, however, were not clearly spelled out in the treaty. Houston was subagent to the Cherokee during the negotiations.

The Cherokee treaty delegates were bribed by Governor Joseph McMinn and John C. Calhoun to ensure a successful removal from Tennessee. Jolly's brother, Tahlonteeskee, received $1,000 and other delegates received $500 each. (Note: The bribing of the treaty negotiators may have been unknown to Houston.) In February 1818, Jolly and his followers left Tennessee with sixteen riverboats, provisions for 70 days, and rifles that they received from the government. They moved to the Arkansas District, living along the Arkansas River near Spadra, Arkansas in Johnson County. When they began to settle on their land, they learned that they were historic hunting grounds of the Quapaw and Osage people, who fought with them. Fort Gibson was established to protect the Cherokee, who had not been at war for some time. They also had pressure from pioneering white people.

Jolly saw that native tribes were being pushed west within the United States. He believed that the tribes should unite and become the United Tribes of America to "...preserve the sinking race of Native Americans from extinction."

=== Planter and businessman ===
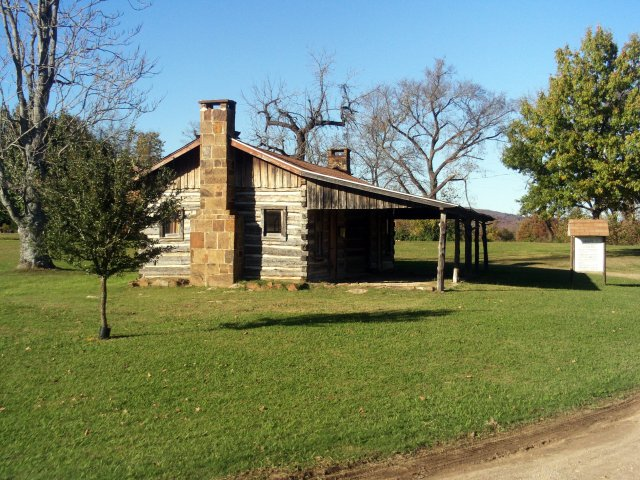
The Dwight Mission was run by missionary Cephas Washburn and was supported by Jolly. The mission was near Jolly's residence.

Jolly had a large plantation, with a network of fields and peach orchards, worked by up to twelve slaves. He had more than 500 head of cattle. He was a generous host to whoever visited his large, fine house. (Note: While many Native American tribes ranged over land to hunt and gather food, Cherokees were among the first agrarians.) His visitors included naturalist Thomas Nuttall. He stayed in contact with Indian agents. Near his house was the Dwight Mission run by missionary Cephas Washburn and was supported by Jolly. Jolly was popular with the planter class, who were often of Cherokee and European descent and whose lives were similar to Southern planters, as well as the full-blooded Cherokee, who did not trust whites and wanted to maintain their culture and heritage.

There are ways in which the Cherokee Nation lived like southern planters. Their labor was supplied by enslaved black people. They had nice goods, clothing, and furnishings that they purchased from Baltimore, Philadelphia, and New Orleans. They copied the fine mansions of the South when they built their homes. But they did not approve of the way that whites lived, and they had their own cultural traditions. For instance, Houston and Jolly followed an ancient tradition among friends where they fed one another from a common spoon.

=== Principal Chief ===
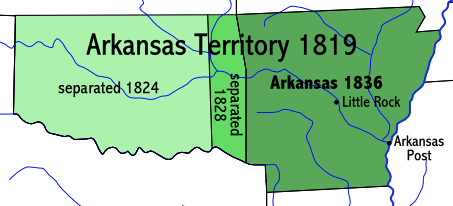
The Arkansas Territory's evolution into Arkansas and Indian Territory. Lovely's Purchase was in the light green area of the map.

Jolly was elected Principal Chief of the Cherokee Nation—West upon the death of his brother Tahlonteeskee in the spring of 1819. He was responsible for managing the affairs of the Cherokee within the Cherokee settlements and with governmental officials over diplomatic issues, particularly the treaties between the Cherokee and the United States government.

=== President ===
Jolly was elected president of the Arkansas Cherokee after the tribal government was reorganized in 1824. He worked with Arkansas territorial authorities and government officials in Washington D.C. regarding treaty rights and security. There was pressure on the Cherokees to relinquish land as Americans settled in the western lands of the United States. He wrote to George Izard, the governor of Arkansas to squelch a rumor that Cherokees were interested in selling any of their land. He also conveyed that the U.S. government had not met the financial terms of the treaty of 1817.

== Oklahoma ==
In 1828, most of the western Cherokee were moved from Indian reserve areas in the Arkansas Territory to the newly established Indian Territory (in present-day Oklahoma). Jolly established a plantation at the confluence of the Arkansas and Illinois Rivers, near present-day Webbers Falls, Oklahoma. During Jolly's term of office, the Cherokee Nation—West adopted a constitution establishing a tripartite government, much like that previously adopted by the Cherokee Nation—East (1827). Jolly established a capital city, Tahlonteeskee, named in honor of his brother.

One writer states that much of Jolly's success "was due to the counsel and support of John Rogers", his brother-in-law and Cherokee headman.

In 1829, Sam Houston sought refuge with Jolly after his brief marriage to Eliza Allen, which sparked many rumors and theories, and led to his resignation as governor of Tennessee. Jolly met Houston when the steamboat arrived at Fort Gibson with a number of his enslaved men bearing torches. Jolly was grateful for Houston's return, both because he was happy to be a place of refuge and because the Nation could use his assistance in ensuring that the Cherokee people's voices were heard by the government. (Note: Jolly said to Houston: "My home is yours—my people are yours—rest with us.")

George Catlin painted his portrait in 1834. He described him as "...a dignified chief … a mixture of white and red blood, of which … the first seems decidedly to predominate". Of his visit to the Cherokee, he mentioned that there were six or seven thousand members of the tribe under Jolly who had removed with him from Tennessee.

Black Coat, who served with Jolly as second chief, died in the spring of 1835, and was succeeded by Joseph Vann.

Jolly served until his death near present-day Webbers Falls, Oklahoma in December 1838. He was succeeded by John Looney, who had been his assistant principal chief.

== Legacy ==
Hiwassee Island, at the mouth of the Hiwassee River where it meets the Tennessee, used to be commonly known as "Jolly's Island" after the Cherokee leader. Residents in the area sometimes still call it that.

== See also ==
- Sequoyah
- Eastern Band of Cherokee Indians
- United Keetoowah Band of Cherokee Indians

== Sources ==
- Gregory, Jack Dwain (1996). Sam Houston with the Cherokees, 1829-1833. University of Oklahoma Press. ISBN 978-0-8061-2809-2.
- McLoughlin, William G. Cherokee Renascence in the New Republic. (Princeton: Princeton University Press, 1992).
- Wilkins, Thurman. Cherokee Tragedy: The Ridge Family and the Decimation of a People. (New York: Macmillan Company, 1970).
- Woodward, Walter M. (2003). "Sam Houston : for Texas and the Union". New York : PowerPlus Books.

Preceded by Tahlonteeskee	Principal Chief of the Cherokee Nation–West; 1819–1838	Succeeded by John Looney
