= John Rogers (Cherokee chief) =

Cherokee chief

Principal Chief of the Cherokee Nation West
- In office December 1838 – July 12, 1839 (Note: The term end date listed is the date of the signing of the Act of Union between the Eastern and Western Cherokee.)
- Preceded by: John Jolly
- Succeeded by: John Brown (disputed); John Looney (disputed); Position disestablished

Personal details
- Born: 1779 Burke County, Georgia
- Died: June 12, 1846 (aged 66–67) Washington D.C.
- Relatives: William Charles Rogers (grandson); John Jolly (half-sister's brother/step-uncle) (Note: According to the Chronicles of Oklahoma, John Jolly was the brother of Jennie Due who was John Rogers half-sister through his mother (Jennie Due would later also be John Rogers step-mother, after his father married her).)

John Rogers was the last elected Principal Chief of the Cherokee Nation West elected in December 1838 by the faction of Old Settlers (Note: "Old Settlers", in the context of Cherokee peoples, refers to Cherokee people who voluntarily relocated to Arkansas before the Trail of Tears.) who rejected the Cherokee Nation constitution of 1839.

== Family and early life ==
Rogers was the son of John Rogers and Elizabeth Due (née Emory) and a relative of previous Cherokee Nation West principal chiefs John Jolly. He was born in Washington County, Tennessee, in 1781. He commanded a Cherokee unit during the Creek War under General Andrew Jackson, reaching the rank of captain. He married Elizabeth Coody. William Charles Rogers was his grandson.

== Traveling and settling west ==
Rogers left with the Old Settlers and first settled in Dardanelle, Arkansas, and later Mulberry, Arkansas. He was a member of the December 1827 delegation to Washington, D.C., and signed the Treaty of Washington of 6 May 1828. In December 1838 he was elected chief by the faction of Old Settlers who rejected the Cherokee Nation constitution of 1839. Rogers opposed John Ross's efforts to liquidate the Cherokee Nation West, but Ross succeeded in creating a constitution to unite the Cherokee Nation West and Cherokee Nation East. Rogers, in order to avoid signing the new agreement of union between the two groups, traveled to Mexico City during its signing in 1840. Rogers had operated a salt works near Salina, Oklahoma, since 1830, but in October 1843, all salt works were nationalized in the Cherokee Nation. In 1846, he traveled to Washington, D.C., to advocate for Old Settler rights, where he died on June 12, 1846.

== Notes ==
Preceded by John Jolly	Principal Chief of the Cherokee Nation West; 1839–1840	Succeeded by Office ceased to exist
