= Lovely's Purchase =

Land acquisition in 1813–1816

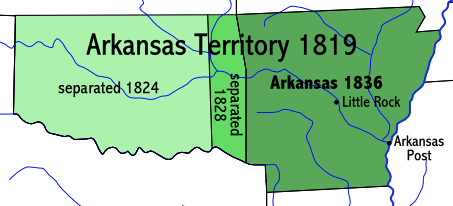
On this map, the: Indian Territory is in teal and Arkansas is in dark green. The western portion of Lovely's Purchase, assigned to Indian Territory in 1828, is in light green. Together with an almost equal amount of lands to the east of the 1828 demarcation line with Indian Territory, was the area that made up the short lived Lovely County, Arkansas Territory.

Lovely's Purchase, also called Lovely's Donation, was part of the Missouri Territory and the Arkansas Territory of the early nineteenth century. It was created in 1817, to give a haven to the Cherokee and other Native Americans who were being forced to leave the southeastern United States and moving west to Indian Territory (modern-day Oklahoma) through territory then inhabited by sometimes hostile European settlers and several other Indigenous nations, especially members of the Osage Nation. Following years of political maneuvering and sometimes conflicting treaties, the purchase was finally split between the Cherokee and European American settlers, with the larger section going solely to the Cherokee Nation.

== Background ==
President James Monroe had promised an exclusive "gateway to the setting sun"—an area devoted to settlement for the members of the Cherokee Nation where they were not "...surrounded by the White man." In the last years of the 18th century, members of the Cherokee Nation living in the western part of the Appalachians in Tennessee, Georgia, Alabama, and the Carolinas, had started migrating west to the lands set aside by the United States government for those citizens willing to exchange their eastern property for homesteads in the recently set-aside Indian Territory. (Note: These early Cherokee migrants came to be known as the "Old Settlers". They had voluntarily uprooted themselves and moved west to lands promised to them by the United States federal government in exchange for giving up their traditional lands back east.) A route was planned by the U.S. government with the purpose to insulate newly arriving Cherokee to the area from interference and harassment by hostile American settlers and warriors from other Indigenous nations. These others lived, hunted, and had (in many instances) squatted on the promised tracts of land. They viewed the Cherokee as rivals.

The Osage Nation had given-up exclusive hunting rights to the area that would become a large part of Lovely's Purchase in the Treaty of Fort Clark (1808). The Osage still owned the land outright, however, and maintained several settlements on it. The new Cherokee emigrants came into almost immediate conflict with Indigenous and European settlers who had preemptively occupied lands along the route. This included citizens of the Quapaw and the Osage Nation, as well as other Indigenous nations, who held a special animosity towards what they viewed as Cherokee usurpers of their lands and way of life. Violent incidents continued to plague both groups, however, and peaked in 1817 following Lovely's death. The next year saw the arrival from the east of a strong Cherokee leader, John Jolly, and these incidents grew less frequent, although they still occasionally occurred.

== Purchase history ==
=== Major Lovely ===
Major William Lovely, an assistant Indian agent to the Tennessee Cherokee, was promoted to Indian agent of the Missouri Territory (Arkansas Region), and sent to quell these frontier disturbances in the Missouri Territory. He held the position from 1813 to 1817. His wife, Persis, (Note: Persis Lovely died 1841.) accompanied him to "...an abandoned Osage village far from what [is] considered civilization..." (Note: In a September 1815 letter addressed to President James Madison, Lovely described the isolation and his neighbors as Indians and “...the worst of White settlers.”) Lovely, a veteran of the Revolutionary War, made several failed diplomatic attempts to make peace between the Cherokee emigrants to Indian Territory and the Osage. His ultimate solution was to create a large strip of land to act as a buffer between the people of the two nations.

Lovely's Purchase, set in the early Arkansaw District of the Missouri Territory, was created as a buffer zone to separate the adversarial Cherokee Nation and Osage Nation. In the summer of 1813, Lovely was sent to administer the first section of acreage that would eventually belong to the purchase. This land comprised approximately four million acres (1,600,000 ha) that had been ceded to the U.S. government in 1808 by the Osage Nation. At Lovely's behest, another treaty summit took place on July 9, 1816, at the mouth of the Verdigris River. At this time, and on his own authority, Lovely agreed to buy an additional three million hunting acres of Osage land that was located between the Verdigris and White River on behalf of the Cherokee. All together, the treaty lands ceded by, and bought from, the Osage totaled over seven million acres (2,800,000 ha). The area began to be referred to as Lovely's Purchase thereafter. The entire northwest corner of the Arkansas Territory now belonged to the Cherokee. Both the Osage and the Cherokee pledged to honor the 1816 treaty, although the U.S. government had not authorized nor endorsed it, and therefore did not officially recognize its terms.

Expandable map of the settlements and land allotments

=== Military intervention ===
The treaty, however, still did not stop the violence between members of the two groups. Due to the buffer area not living up to expectations, in 1817 the U.S. Army built Fort Smith, (Note: Historic Ft. Smith was in Sebastian County, Arkansas.) and the U.S. government made it clear that Lovely's Purchase would only house Native Americans from that time on. (Note: With a presidential proviso that "...[Persis Lovely] is to remain where she lives during life...” According to the Treaty of 1818, William Lovely's widow was the only European settler legally allowed to stay on the Purchase lands.) Another treaty between Osage and Cherokee was signed in 1818 at St. Louis, one that finally formalized the earlier Lovely's Purchase, and was this time endorsed by the U.S.

In 1819, Arkansas was separated from the Missouri Territory, and became an official organized territory of the United States. Lovely's Purchase was made part of Crawford County at that time. In 1822, due to requests by territorial governor James Miller, the U.S. authorized another outpost and established Fort Gibson (Note: Ft. Gibson was in modern Muskogee County, Oklahoma.) (finished in 1824). Fort Gibson was manned by the U.S. Seventh Infantry. The large area these forts oversaw was dubbed "Lovely's Donations" by later legislators. The area still remained contentious, with complaints to the legislators from both European settlers—who were continually being moved out of the ever expanding Lovely Purchase—and the Cherokee—who were being pressured to abandon the rich farmlands and salt mine tracts to the European Americans.

=== Lovely County ===
A sutler by the name of John Nicks accompanied the Seventh Infantry to Fort Gibson, and eventually settled in the area of the fort. In 1828, he founded Nicksville, the future capital of Lovely County. (Note: Nicksville was located in what became Sequoyah County, Oklahoma) More than a decade after Lovely's 1817 death, the area—along with additional tracts of purchased and donated land—was incorporated by the Territory of Arkansas as the short-lived Lovely County.

Lovely's Purchase was, without federal authorization, created a county by the Arkansas legislature in 1827 in an effort to keep the area part of the planned State of Arkansas, and European Americans immediately started settling there. Lovely County only existed from October 31, 1827, to May 6, 1828, when the U.S. government signed the Cherokee Treaty of 1828. Lovely County had included all or part of present-day Benton, Washington, Crawford counties in Arkansas; plus all or part of present-day Delaware, Sequoyah, Adair, Cherokee, Wagoner, Muskogee, and Mayes counties in present-day Oklahoma.

== Division of the purchase lands ==
The new treaty authorized the western half of the land donations, accumulations, and homestead purchases that had created the 'Lovely Purchase' to become part of Indian Territory. The land was given entirely to the Cherokee Nation—West of the Mississippi, while the Osage were moved to the unorganized territory of Kansas—to finally put an end to the hostilities. The eastern part of the purchase remained with Arkansas and the European Americans occupying the territory. To expedite completion of the compromise, any displaced Indian was given: "...a good rifle, a blanket, a kettle, and 5 lbs. of tobacco when he agreed to move..." while any displaced frontier settler was awarded with: "...up to 320 acres of public domain land in Arkansas Territory for every head of household over the age of 21 years."
