= Cherokee Nation (1794–1907) =

Historic, autonomous Native American government

Cherokee Nation ᏣᎳᎩᎯ ᎠᏰᎵ
- 1794–1907
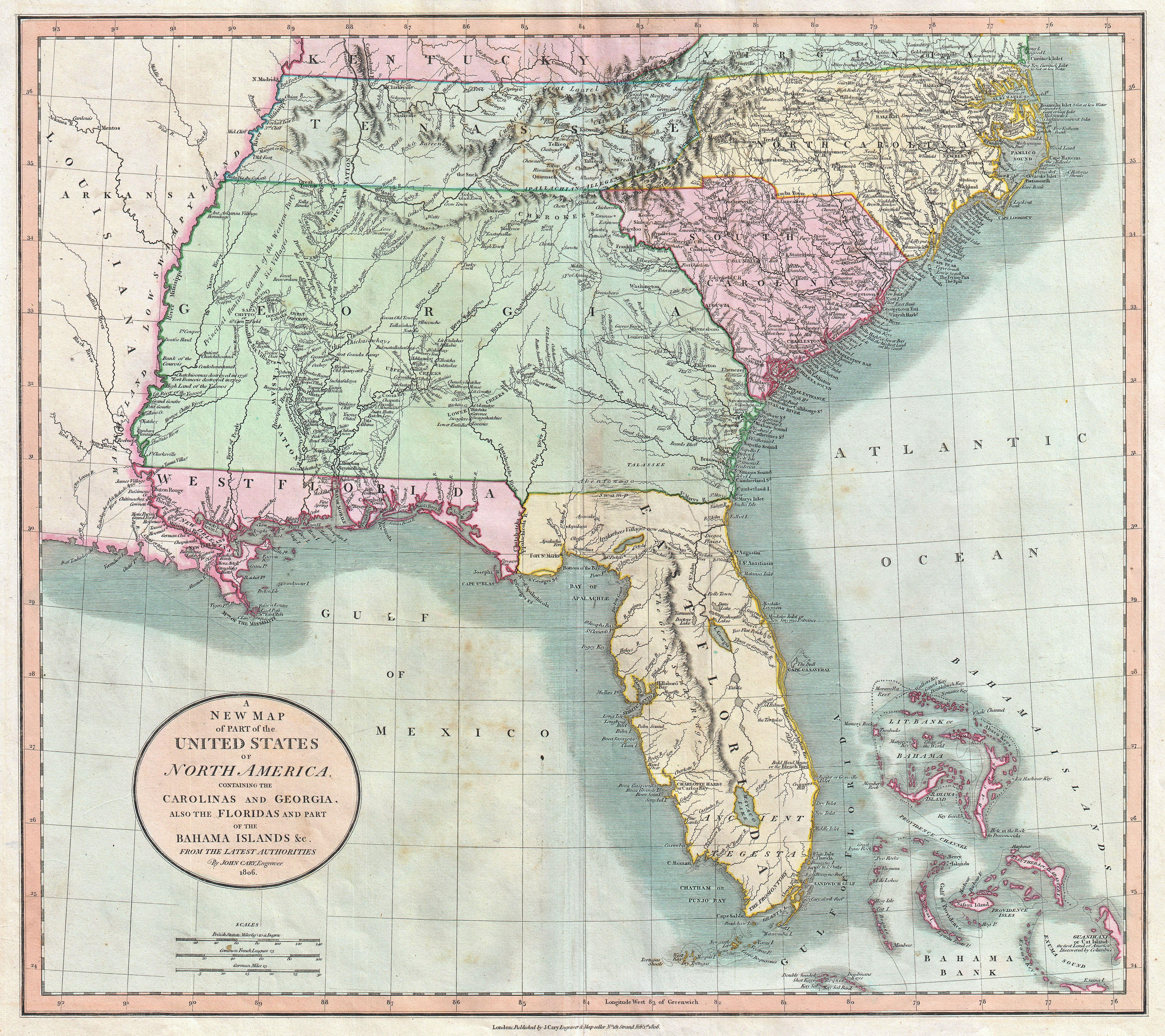
- Southeastern U.S. and Indian territories, including Cherokee, Creek, and Chickasaw; 1806
- Status: Distinct political community (per Worcester v. Georgia)
- Capital: New Echota 1825–1839; Tahlequah 1839–1907 35°54′N 94°58′W
- Common languages: Cherokee
- Government: Autonomous tribal government
- Principal Chief
- Historical era: Post-colonial to early 20th century
  - Treaty with the Cherokee (affirming Treaty of Holston): June 26, 1794
  - New Echota officially designated capital city: November 12, 1825
  - Treaty of New Echota: December 29, 1835
  - Cherokee Trail of Tears: 1838–1839
  - Tahlequah becomes new official capital: September 6, 1839
  - Oklahoma statehood; governmental functions curtailed: November 16, 1907
- Today part of: United States; Oklahoma

The Cherokee Nation (Cherokee: ᏣᎳᎩᎯ ᎠᏰᎵ, romanized: Tsalagi Ayeli) was an autonomous tribal government of the Cherokee people that existed from 1794 to 1907. Often referred to as "The Nation" by its inhabitants, the government was centered first at New Echota in present-day Georgia and, after removal to Indian Territory, at Tahlequah. In 1827 the Nation adopted a written constitution with legislative, executive, and judicial branches, and in 1832 the United States Supreme Court affirmed in Worcester v. Georgia that the Cherokee Nation was a "distinct political community" in which state laws had no force.

The Nation encompassed the Cherokee of the southeastern United States; the "Old Settlers" who had relocated voluntarily to Indian Territory beginning around 1820; those forcibly removed along the Trail of Tears in the 1830s; and incorporated peoples including the Natchez, Lenape, and Shawnee. After the American Civil War, in which most Cherokee leaders allied with the Confederacy, a new treaty required the Nation to emancipate its slaves and grant citizenship to Cherokee Freedmen.

The Curtis Act of 1898 extended allotment to the Five Civilized Tribes, and the Five Civilized Tribes Act of April 26, 1906, curtailed the Cherokee tribal government in preparation for Oklahoma statehood on November 16, 1907. The Cherokee people reorganized during the 20th century as the Cherokee Nation, which holds federal recognition as a sovereign tribal government.

== History ==
The Cherokee called themselves the Aniyunwiya. In their language, this meant "leading" or "principal" people. Before 1794, the Cherokee had no standing national government. Its people were highly decentralized and lived in bands and clans according to a matrilineal kinship system. The people lived in towns located in scattered autonomous tribal areas related by kinship throughout the southern Appalachia region. Various leaders were periodically appointed (by mutual consent of the towns) to represent the towns or bands to French, British and, later, United States authorities as was needed. The Cherokee knew this leader as "First Beloved Man" —or Uku. The English had translated this as "chief".

The chief's function was to serve as focal point for negotiations with the encroaching Europeans. Hanging Maw was recognized as a chief by the United States government, but not by the majority of Cherokee peoples.

At the end of the Cherokee–American wars (1794), Little Turkey was recognized as "Principal Chief of the Cherokee Nation" by all the towns. At that time, Cherokee communities were on lands claimed by the states of North Carolina, South Carolina, Georgia, and the Overhill area, located in present-day eastern Tennessee.

The break-away Chickamauga band (or Lower Cherokee), led by Dragging Canoe (Tsiyugunsini, c. 1738–1792), established towns along Chickamauga Creek near present-day Chattanooga and later shifted west and southwest into present-day Alabama.

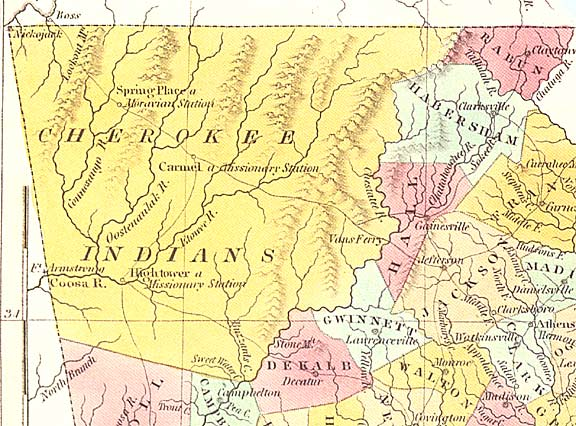
The Cherokee Nation Lands in 1830 Georgia, before the Trail of Tears

U.S. President George Washington sought to "civilize" the southeastern Native peoples, through programs overseen by U.S. Indian Agent Benjamin Hawkins. Facilitated by the destruction of many Cherokee towns during the American Revolutionary War, U.S. land agents encouraged Native Americans to abandon their historic communal-land tenure and settle on isolated subsistence farmsteads. Over-harvesting by the deerskin trade had brought white-tailed deer in the region to the brink of extinction. Americans introduced pig and cattle raising, and these animals replaced deer as the principal sources of meat. The Americans supplied the tribes with spinning wheels and cotton-seed, and men were taught to fence and plow the land. (In the Cherokee traditional division of labor, most cultivation for farming was done by women.) Women were instructed in weaving. Eventually, blacksmiths, gristmills and cotton plantations (along with slave labor) were established.

Succeeding Little Turkey as Principal Chief were Black Fox (1801–1811) and Pathkiller (1811–1827), both former warriors of Dragging Canoe. "The separation", a phrase which the Cherokee used to describe the period after 1776, when the Chickamauga had left other bands that were in close proximity to Anglo-American settlements, officially ended at the Cherokee reunification council of 1809.

Three important veterans of the Cherokee–American wars, James Vann (a successful businessman) and his two protégés, The Ridge (also called Ganundalegi or "Major" Ridge) and Charles R. Hicks, made up the younger 'Cherokee Triumvirate.' These leaders advocated acculturation of the people, formal education of the young, and introduction of European-American farming methods. In 1801 they invited Moravian missionaries to their territory from North Carolina to teach Christianity and the 'arts of civilized life.' The Moravian, and later Congregationalist, missionaries also ran boarding schools. A select few students were chosen to be educated at the American Board of Commissioners for Foreign Missions school in Connecticut.

These men continued to be leaders in the nation. Hicks participated in the Red Stick War, a civil war between traditional and progressive Creek factions. This coincided with part of U.S. involvement in the War of 1812 against Great Britain. He was the de facto Principal Chief from 1813 to 1827.

=== Constitutional governments ===
The Cherokee Nation—East had first created electoral districts in 1817. By 1822, the Cherokee Supreme Court was founded. Lastly, the Cherokee Nation adopted a written constitution in 1827 that created a government with three branches: legislative, executive, and judicial. The Principal Chief was elected by the National Council, which was the legislature of the Nation. A similar constitution was adopted by the Cherokee Nation—West in 1833.

In 1832, the United States Supreme Court ruled in Worcester v. Georgia that the Cherokee Nation was a distinct political community in which the laws of Georgia had no force, affirming the nation's sovereignty. Despite the ruling, the state of Georgia and President Andrew Jackson refused to enforce the decision, and pressure for Cherokee removal continued.

The Constitution of the reunited Cherokee Nation was ratified at Tahlequah, Oklahoma on September 6, 1839, at the conclusion of "The Removal". The signing is commemorated every Labor Day weekend with the celebration of the Cherokee National Holiday.

=== Removal ===
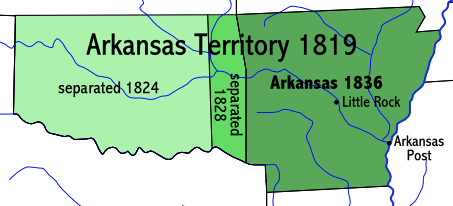
The Arkansas Territory division: showing the progression of Indian Territory separation from Arkansas Territory, 1819–1836

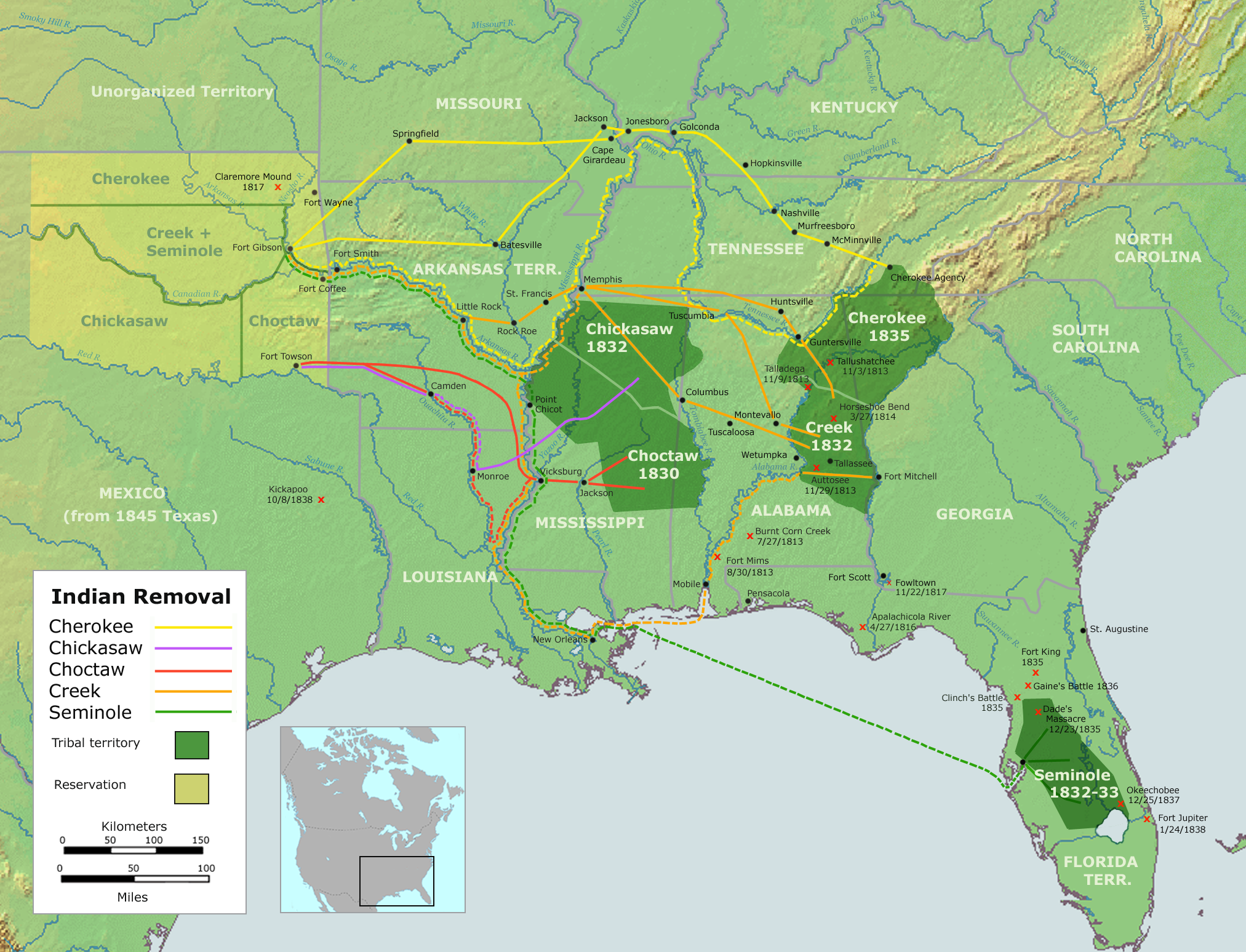
Map of Southern United States during the time of the Indian Removals (Trail of Tears), 1830–1838, showing the historic lands of the Five Civilized Tribes (as they were then known). The destination Indian Territory is depicted in light yellow-green.

In 1802, the U.S. federal government promised representatives of the state of Georgia to extinguish Native American titles to internal Georgia lands in return for the state's formal cession of its unincorporated western claim (which was made part of the Mississippi Territory). Negotiating with states to give up western claims was part of the unfinished business from the American Revolution and establishing of the United States. European Americans were seeking more land in what became known as the Deep South because of the expansion of cotton plantations. Invention of the cotton gin had made short-staple cotton profitable, and it could be cultivated in the uplands of Georgia, Alabama, and Mississippi.

In 1815, the U.S. government established a Cherokee Reservation in the Arkansas district of the Missouri Territory and tried to convince the Cherokee to move there voluntarily. The reservation boundaries extended from north of the Arkansas River to the southern bank of the White River. The Cherokee who moved to this reservation became known as the "Old Settlers" or Western Cherokee.

By additional treaties signed with the U.S., in 1817 (Treaty of the Cherokee Agency, 8 July 1817) and 1819 (Treaty of Washington, 27 February 1819), the Cherokee exchanged remaining communal lands in Georgia (north of the Hiwassee River), Tennessee, and North Carolina for lands in the Arkansas Territory west of the Mississippi River. A majority of the remaining Cherokee resisted these treaties and refused to leave their lands east of the Mississippi. Finally, in 1830, the United States Congress enacted the Indian Removal Act to bolster the treaties and forcibly free up title to the lands desired by the states. At this time, one-third of the remaining Cherokee left voluntarily, especially because the act was being enforced by use of government troops and the Georgia militia. Although The Treaty of New Echota was not approved by the Cherokee National Council nor signed by Principal Chief John Ross, it was amended and ratified in March 1836, and became the legal basis for the forcible removal known as the Trail of Tears.

Most of the settlements were established in the area around the western capital of Tahlontiskee (near present-day Gore, Oklahoma).

=== American Civil War and Reconstruction ===
National Color of the 1st Cherokee Mounted Rifles

Within the Cherokee Nation, there were advocates for neutrality, a Union alliance, and a Confederate alliance. Two prominent Cherokee, John Ross and Stand Watie were slaveholders and shared some values with Southern plantation owners. Watie thought it best for the Cherokee to side with the Confederacy, while Ross thought it better to remain neutral. This split was due to the Union's and Southern state's involvement of the Trail of Tears, which complicated the nation's political outlook. Within the first year of the war, general consensus in the nation moved towards siding with the Confederacy.

Numerous skirmishes took place in the Trans-Mississippi area, which included the Cherokee Nation–West. There were seven officially recognized battles involving Native American units, who were either allied with the Confederate States of America or loyal to the United States government. 3,000 out of 21,000 citizens served as soldiers in the Confederacy. Among them were William Penn Adair (1830–1880), a Cherokee senator and diplomat who held the rank of Colonel, and Nimrod Jarrett Smith (1837–1893), who later became Principal Chief of the Eastern Band. Stand Watie raided Union positions in the Indian Territory with his 1st Cherokee Mounted Rifles Regiment of the Army of Trans-Mississippi well after the Confederacy had abandoned the area, becoming the last Confederate general to surrender on June 23, 1865.

After the war, the United States negotiated new treaties with the Five Civilized Tribes. All Five Tribes acknowledged "in writing that, because of the agreements they had made with the Confederate States during the Civil War, previous treaties made with the United States would no longer be upheld, thus prompting the need for a new treaty and an opportunity for the United States to fulfill its goal of wrenching more land" from their grasp. The new treaty established peace and requiring them to emancipate their slaves and to offer them citizenship and territory within the reservation if the freedmen chose to stay with the tribe, as the U.S. had done for enslaved African Americans. The area was made part of the reconstruction of the former Confederate States overseen by military officers and governors appointed by the federal government.

A 2020 study contrasted the successful distribution of free land to former slaves in the Cherokee Nation with the failure to give former slaves in the Confederacy free land. The study found that even though levels of inequality in 1860 were similar in the Cherokee Nation and the Confederacy, former black slaves prospered in the Cherokee Nation over the next decades. The Cherokee Nation had lower levels of racial inequality where blacks saw higher incomes, higher literacy rates, and greater school attendance.

=== Dissolution ===
In 1898, Congress passed the Curtis Act, extending the Dawes Act of 1887 to the Five Civilized Tribes. The act forced dissolution of tribally held lands in favor of individual allotments, terminated the tribal courts, and gave the federal government authority to determine tribal membership. It also granted residents of Indian Territory voting rights in local elections and authorized the federal government to incorporate towns and establish public schools.

All Native people in Indian Territory received United States citizenship under an act (31 Stat. 1447) of March 3, 1901. The Cherokee Nation entered an allotment agreement in 1902, providing each tribal citizen with forty acres of inalienable homestead land and seventy acres of surplus land. In 1905, leaders of the Five Civilized Tribes sought approval for a State of Sequoyah with a Native American constitution, but the proposal failed in Congress.

Under the Curtis Act's original terms, the tribal governments were to be abolished on March 6, 1906. Congress instead passed the Five Civilized Tribes Act on April 26, 1906, which curtailed but did not fully abolish the Cherokee government: the office of Principal Chief continued for limited purposes, but the tribal courts and legislature ceased to function. Oklahoma achieved statehood on November 16, 1907, absorbing the former Indian Territory. The federal government thereafter occasionally appointed chiefs of a nominal "Cherokee Nation" as needed to execute legal instruments.

=== Legacy and reorganization ===
After statehood, the structure of Cherokee tribal government remained undefined for decades. The Oklahoma Indian Welfare Act of 1936 extended provisions of the Indian Reorganization Act to Oklahoma tribes, encouraging them to re-establish governments. The Cherokee convened a general convention in 1938 to elect a new chief and reconstitute the Cherokee Nation.

In 1949, President Harry S. Truman appointed W. W. Keeler as Principal Chief. The Principal Chiefs Act of 1970 (84 Stat. 1091) authorized the Five Civilized Tribes to select their principal officers by popular election; Keeler won the first such election in 1971, the first elected chief since 1903, and oversaw the drafting of a new constitution ratified on June 26, 1976. Ross Swimmer served as Principal Chief from 1975 to 1985, when he resigned to become Assistant Secretary of the Interior for Indian Affairs. Deputy Chief Wilma Mankiller succeeded him, becoming the first woman to serve as Principal Chief of the Cherokee Nation; she won election in her own right in 1987 and served until 1995.

In 2020, the United States Supreme Court ruled in McGirt v. Oklahoma that the Muscogee (Creek) Nation's reservation had never been disestablished by Congress. Subsequent lower court decisions applied the same reasoning to the Cherokee Nation's historic boundaries. In 2022, however, the Court held in Oklahoma v. Castro-Huerta that states retain concurrent criminal jurisdiction over non-Indians on tribal land, limiting the practical scope of the McGirt ruling.

== Indian Territory ==
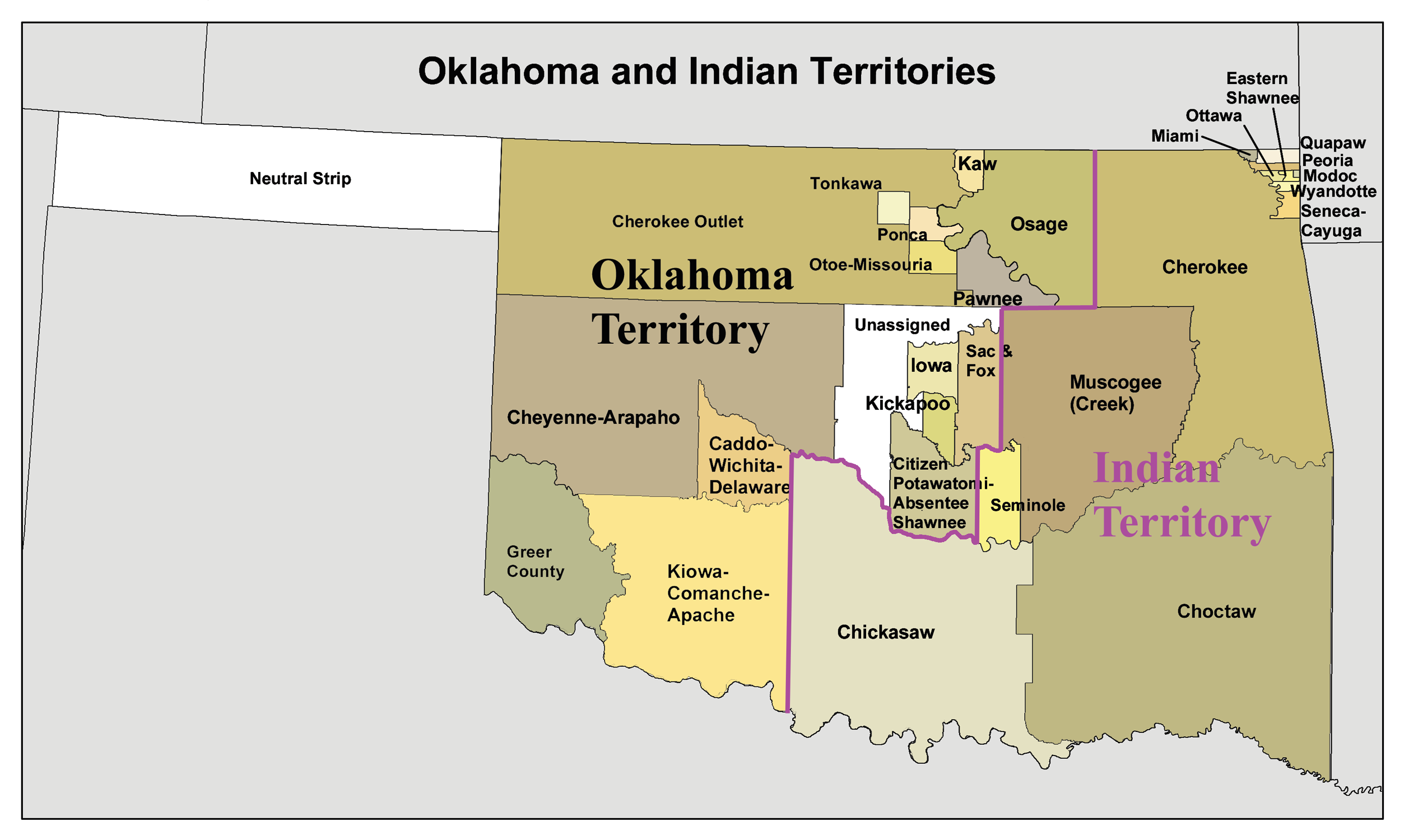
Oklahoma Territory and Indian Territory, along with No Man's Land (also known as the Oklahoma Panhandle). The division of the two territories is shown with a heavy purple line. Together, these three areas would become the State of Oklahoma in 1907.

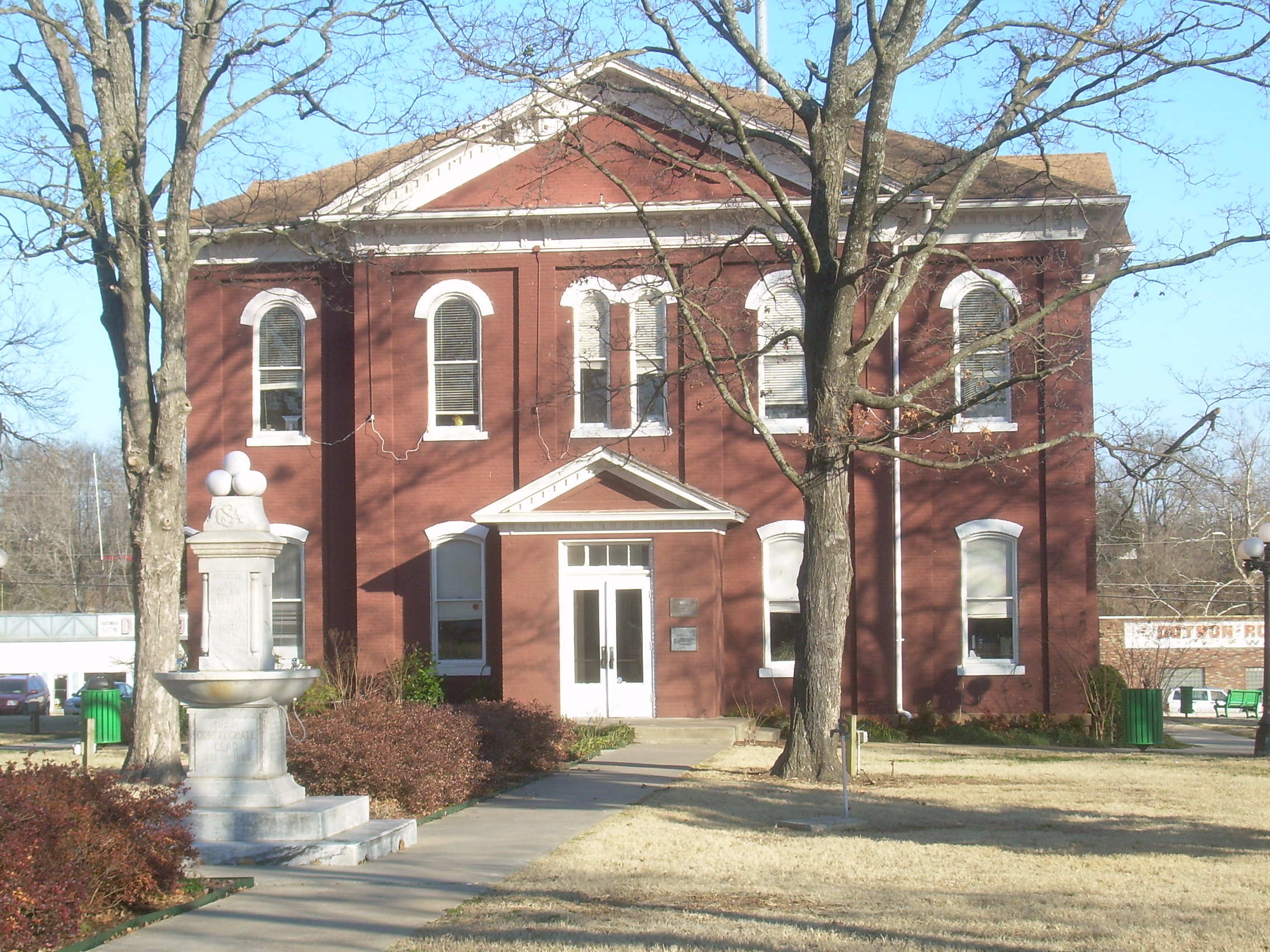
The Cherokee National Capitol (completed 1869), Tahlequah, Oklahoma, served as the seat of Cherokee Nation government from 1869 to 1907.

The Cherokee Nation was divided into nine districts named Canadian, Cooweescoowee, Delaware, Flint, Goingsnake, Illinois, Saline, Sequoyah, and Tahlequah (capital).

=== Cherokee capital ===
Founded in 1838, Tahlequah was developed as the new capital of a united Cherokee Nation. It was named after the historic Great Tellico, an important Cherokee town and cultural center in present-day Tennessee that was one of the largest Cherokee towns ever established. The mostly European-American settlement of Tellico Plains later developed at the site. Indications of Cherokee influence can be found in and about Tahlequah. For example, street signs appear in both the Cherokee language—in the syllabary alphabet created by Sequoyah (c. 1770–1843)—and in English.

=== Cherokee National Capitol ===
Designed by architect C. W. Goodlander in the 'late Italianate' style, the Cherokee National Capitol was constructed between 1867 and 1869. Originally, it housed the nation's court as well as other offices. In 1961, the U.S. Department of the Interior designated it a National Historic Landmark.

== Economy ==
The Cherokee Nation developed a diversified economy in Indian Territory. During the period from 1849 to 1860, known as the "Golden Age of the Cherokees," the planter and merchant class prospered alongside traditional subsistence farmers. The average Cherokee household enjoyed a standard of living comparable to neighboring settlers in Arkansas, Kansas, and Missouri.

Salt production was the Nation's first commercial industry. As early as 1815, licenses were granted to operate salt works on the Grand River. In 1843 the Cherokee government nationalized the salines and leased them to operators including Lewis Ross, brother of Chief John Ross. The Nation also regulated a network of ferries and toll roads; by 1870, turnpikes, toll bridges, and ferries covered the full length of the Texas Road.

The Cherokee Outlet, approximately seven million acres west of the Nation's eastern lands, generated revenue through cattle-grazing leases. By 1889 the Cherokee Strip Live Stock Association paid $200,000 annually for grazing rights. This income funded schools and government operations. In 1890, President Benjamin Harrison closed the Outlet to cattlemen, and the Nation, driven near bankruptcy, ceded the land to the United States.

== Education ==
Literacy among the Cherokee expanded after Sequoyah completed the Cherokee syllabary around 1821. The 85-character writing system allowed speakers to read and write Cherokee immediately, and the Cherokee Phoenix, launched in 1828 at New Echota, became the first Native American newspaper in the United States.

The Cherokee Nation established a public school system in 1841, among the first in Indian Territory. By 1843 the system included eighteen schools; by the 1890s it encompassed 144 elementary schools and two boarding seminaries. Historian Grant Foreman assessed that "the Cherokee Nation had a better common school system than either Arkansas or Missouri." The Cherokee Male and Female Seminaries, opened in 1851, were boarding schools modeled on Yale College and Mount Holyoke Female Seminary, with curriculum in Greek, Latin, sciences, and history. The Female Seminary burned on Easter Sunday 1887 and reopened north of Tahlequah in 1889; after statehood, Oklahoma purchased the building for $40,000 to establish what became Northeastern State University.

The Cherokee Advocate, first published September 26, 1844, was the only tribal newspaper in the United States at its founding. Published weekly in Cherokee and English, it covered government proceedings and negotiations with Washington until its final issue on March 4, 1906.

== People ==
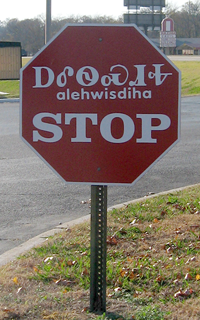
Tahlequah, Oklahoma stop sign, written in English and Cherokee

The Nation was made up of scattered peoples mostly living in the Cherokee Nation–West and the United Keetoowah Band of Cherokee Indians (both residing in the Indian Territory by the 1840s), and the Cherokee Nation–East (Eastern Band of Cherokee Indians); these became the three federally recognized tribes of Cherokee in the 20th century.

=== Delaware ===
In 1866, some Delaware (Lenape) were relocated to the Cherokee Nation from Kansas, where they had been sent in the 1830s. Assigned to the northeast area of the Indian Territory, they united with the Cherokee Nation in 1867. The Delaware Tribes operated autonomously within the lands of the Cherokee Nation.

=== Natchez ===
The Natchez are a Native American people who originally lived in the Natchez Bluffs area. The present-day city of Natchez, Mississippi developed in their former territory. By the mid-eighteenth century, the Natchez people were defeated by French colonists and dispersed from there. Many survivors had been sold (by the French) into slavery in the West Indies. Others took refuge with allied tribes, one of which was the Cherokee.

=== Shawnee ===
Known as the Loyal Shawnee or Cherokee Shawnee, this band of Shawnee people had been removed from their homelands in Ohio to Kansas in the 1830s. The term "Loyal" came from their service in the Union army during the American Civil War. After the war, European Americans encroached and settled on their lands in Kansas.

In 1869, the Cherokee Nation and Loyal Shawnee agreed that 722 of the Shawnee would be granted Cherokee citizenship. They settled in Craig and Rogers counties.

=== Swan Creek and Black River Chippewa ===
The Anishinaabe-speaking Swan Creek and Black River Chippewa bands were removed from southeast Michigan to Kansas in 1839. After Kansas became a state and the Civil War ended, European-American settlers pushed out the Native Americans. Like the Delaware, the two Chippewa bands were relocated to the Cherokee Nation in 1866. They were so few in number that they eventually merged with the Cherokee.

=== Cherokee Freedmen ===
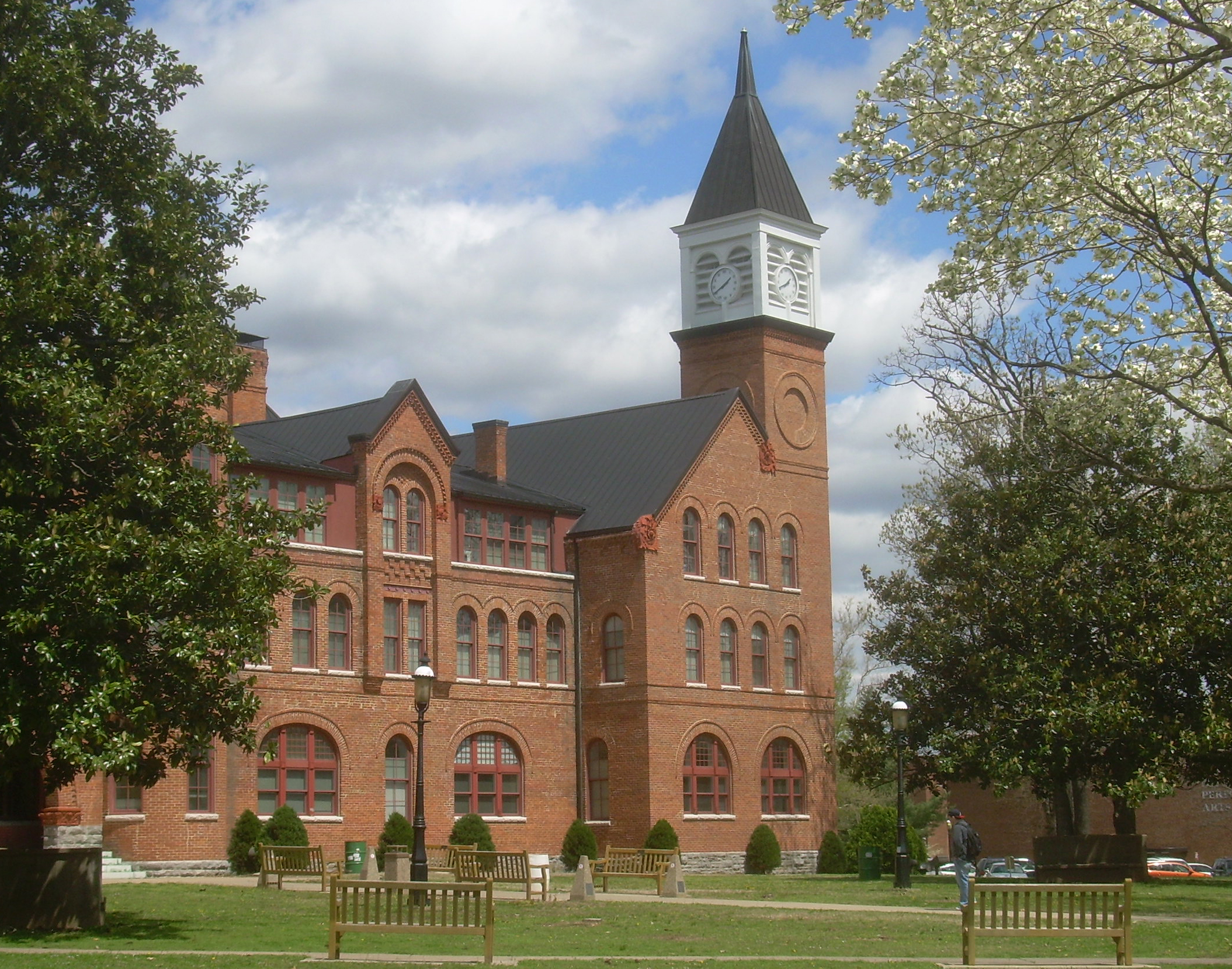
The second Cherokee Female Seminary was opened in 1889 by the original Cherokee Nation.

The Cherokee Freedmen were former African American slaves who had been owned by citizens of the Cherokee Nation during the Antebellum Period. In 1863, President Lincoln issued the Emancipation Proclamation, which declared enslaved people in the Confederate States to be free. After the war, the U.S. government required the Cherokee to emancipate their slaves and grant full Cherokee citizenship to those who wanted to stay with the nation. This was later guaranteed in 1866 under a treaty with the United States.

== Notable Cherokee Nation citizens ==
This list of historic people includes only documented Cherokee living in, or born into, the original Cherokee Nation who are not mentioned in the main article:

- Elias Boudinot, Galagina (1802–1839), statesman, orator, and editor; founded the first Cherokee newspaper, the Cherokee Phoenix. Assassinated by opponents for signing the New Echota Treaty to cede lands in the East
- Ned Christie (1852–1892), statesman, Cherokee Nation senator, and outlaw
- Admiral Joseph J. Clark (1893–1971), United States Navy, highest-ranking naval officer of Native American descent in U.S. history
- Doublehead, Taltsuska (d. 1807), a war leader during the Cherokee–American wars, led the Lower Cherokee, and signed land deals with the U.S.
- Junaluska (c. 1775–1868), a veteran of the Battle of Horseshoe Bend, where Cherokee fighters under his leadership outflanked the Creeks by swimming the Tallapoosa River and seizing their canoes
- John Ridge, Skatlelohski (1792–1839), son of Major Ridge, statesman and signer of the New Echota Treaty, assassinated by opponents
- John Rollin Ridge, Cheesquatalawny, or "Yellow Bird" (1827–1867), grandson of Major Ridge, first Native American novelist
- Clement V. Rogers (1839–1911), Cherokee senator, judge, cattleman, member of the Oklahoma Constitutional Convention
- Will Rogers (November 4, 1879 – August 15, 1935), Cherokee entertainer, roper, journalist, and author
- Redbird Smith (1850–1918), traditionalist, political activist, and chief of the Keetoowah Nighthawk Society
- William Holland Thomas, Wil' Usdi (1805–1893), non-Native who was adopted into the tribe, founding Principal Chief of the Eastern Band of Cherokee Indians, commanding officer of the Thomas Legion of Cherokee Indians and Highlanders
- Nancy Ward, Nanye-hi (c. 1738 – 1822/4), Beloved Woman, diplomat

== In popular culture ==
- Indian Reservation (The Lament of the Cherokee Reservation Indian) (or the Cherokee Nation song) by Paul Revere & the Raiders tells of the plight of the Cherokee Nation.

== See also ==
- Cherokee Commission
- Cherokee military history
- Chief Vann House Historic Site
- Timeline of Cherokee removal
