= Four Mothers Society =

Native American socio-religious organization in Oklahoma, U.S.

The Four Mothers Society or Four Mothers Nation is a religious, political, and traditionalist organization of Muscogee, Cherokee, Choctaw and Chickasaw people, as well as the Natchez people enrolled in these tribes, in Oklahoma. Four Mothers Society ceremonial grounds remain active in the early 21st century.

It was formed in the 1890s as an opposition movement to the allotment policies of the Dawes Commission and various US Congressional acts of the period. The society is religious in nature. It opposed allotment because dividing tribal communal lands attacked the basis of their culture. In addition, some communal lands would be declared surplus and likely sold to non-Natives, causing the loss of their lands.

At the organization's peak, it had more than 24,000 members.

== Background ==
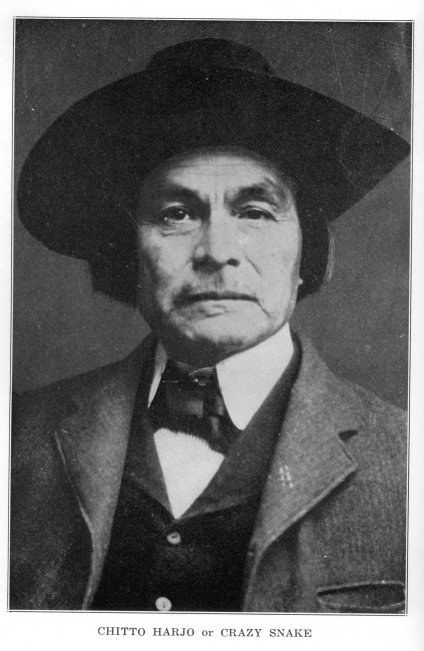
Portrait of Chitto Harjo, Muscogee military leader, c. 1900

The Four Mothers Society has roots in the 19th century. It was formally founded as a dues-collecting organization about 1895 in Sulphur Springs, Indian Territory. It continued in this legal incarnation until 1915, and likely much later.

With the passage of the Curtis Act in 1898 and Dawes Act, allotment became US policy, that is, lands held in common by tribes were broken into small parcels deeded to individual tribal citizens. The various tribal governments were forced to agree to allotment, and their members were registered to establish heads of household. Many members of the Four Mothers Society were outraged that communal lands were being broken up and allocated to households.

Chitto Harjo (Muscogee) set up a new Muscogee government in Henryetta, which many Muscogee who opposed allotment acknowledged as the legitimate government. In 1900, Harjo's followers held a meeting at Hickory ceremonial grounds; they declared that Pleasant Porter and his government had violated the 1867 Muscogee Constitution. They declared Porter's government invalid and declared Harjo to be the new principal chief.

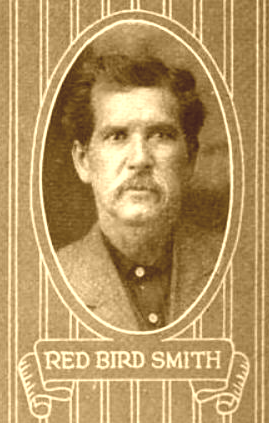
Portrait of Redbird Smith, Cherokee organizer of the Four Mothers Society

Primary organizers of the Four Mothers Society were Eufaula Harjo (Muscogee), a fullblood traditionalist, and Redbird Smith (Cherokee). Smith was a traditionalist and founder of the Nighthawk Keetoowah Society who also became involved in the Four Mothers Society. He was advised by Creek Sam (Natchez/Muscogee), who also interpreted Redbird Smith's communication into Muscogee at Four Mothers Society meetings.

In 1906, the group submitted a petition of 186 signatures to Congress, so that a delegation could be sent to Washington, D.C., to discuss treaty violations and their concerns over official tribal leadership. Harjo spoke before the Senate, supported by the Four Mothers Nation.

The Four Mothers Society was also associated with the movement for a State of Sequoyah. Rather than agreeing to merge with Oklahoma Territory and apply for admission to the Union, they proposed a state to be set aside for Native Americans.

Besides openly opposing allotment, the Four Mothers Society maintains ceremonial groups for stomp dances, stickball games, feasts, meetings, and ceremonies. In the late 1980s the Chickasaw had at least one dance ground and the Cherokee another.

In the early 21st century, several Four Mothers Society grounds are active in eastern Oklahoma.

== Representation in other media ==
Author LeAnne Howe (Choctaw Nation of Oklahoma) refers to the Four Mothers Society in her novels in the context of traditional matriarchal culture. She explores it at length in her book Miko Kings.

== See also ==
- Black drink
- Crazy Snake Uprising, 1901
- Green corn ceremony
- Coosa
- Nighthawk Keetoowah Society

== Bibliography ==
- Debo, Angie (1940). And Still the Waters Run: The Betrayal of the Five Civilized Tribes. Princeton, NJ: Princeton University Press. Reprinted 2022, ISBN 9780691237770.
