= Harjo =

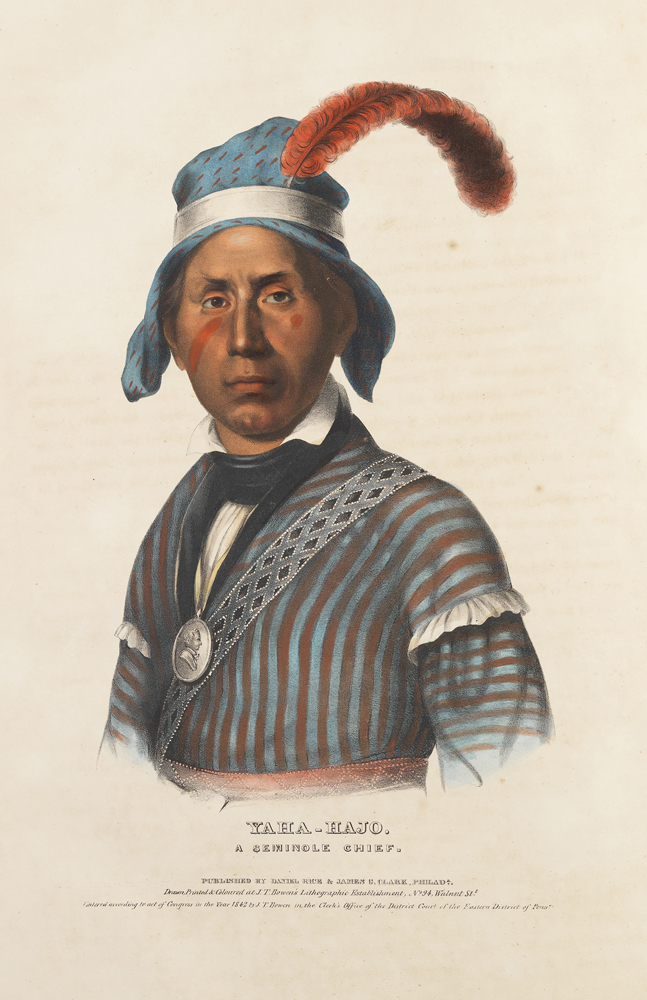
Portrait of Ya-ha Hadjo (Muscogee, died 1836) in History of the Indian Tribes of North America

Harjo, also spelled Hadjo, is a war title and surname derived from the Muscogee word haco, meaning "active" or "crazy".

Poet Joy Harjo (Muscogee) defines the term as "so brave as to seem crazy", historian Mace Davis defines it as "brave beyond discretion" or "foolhardy", and Donald Fixico (Sac & Fox/Muscogee/Seminole/Shawnee) defines it as "fearless person".

The term is also spelled Hadcho and Hadsho.

== Military title ==
Most Seminole leaders from the period of the Seminole Wars are known by their war titles, which were always Muscogee in form, even if their primary language was Mikasuki. The following hadjos are known from the first half of the 19th century in Florida, primarily from the Seminole Wars:

- Apayaka Hadjo (Seminole/Miccosukee, c. 1781 – c. 1866), more commonly known as Abiaka
- Chitto Hadjo (Seminole, 19th c.), raided northeast Florida in 1842, not to be confused with Chitto Harjo (Muscogee, c. 1846–c. 1912)
- Coa Hadjo (Seminole, 19th c.), arrested under a white flag together with Osceola
- Efau Hadjo, Mad Dog (1710–1812), Muscogee war chief
- Fuse Hadjo (Seminole, 19th c.), represented Billy Bowlegs in negotiations with the US Army
- Halleck Hadjo (Seminole, 19th c.), captured after Battle of Loxahatchee
- Josiah Francis (Hillis Hadjo) (Muscogee, c. 1770–1818), religious leader
- Ya-ha Hadjo (Muscogee, died 1836)

== Notable people named Harjo ==
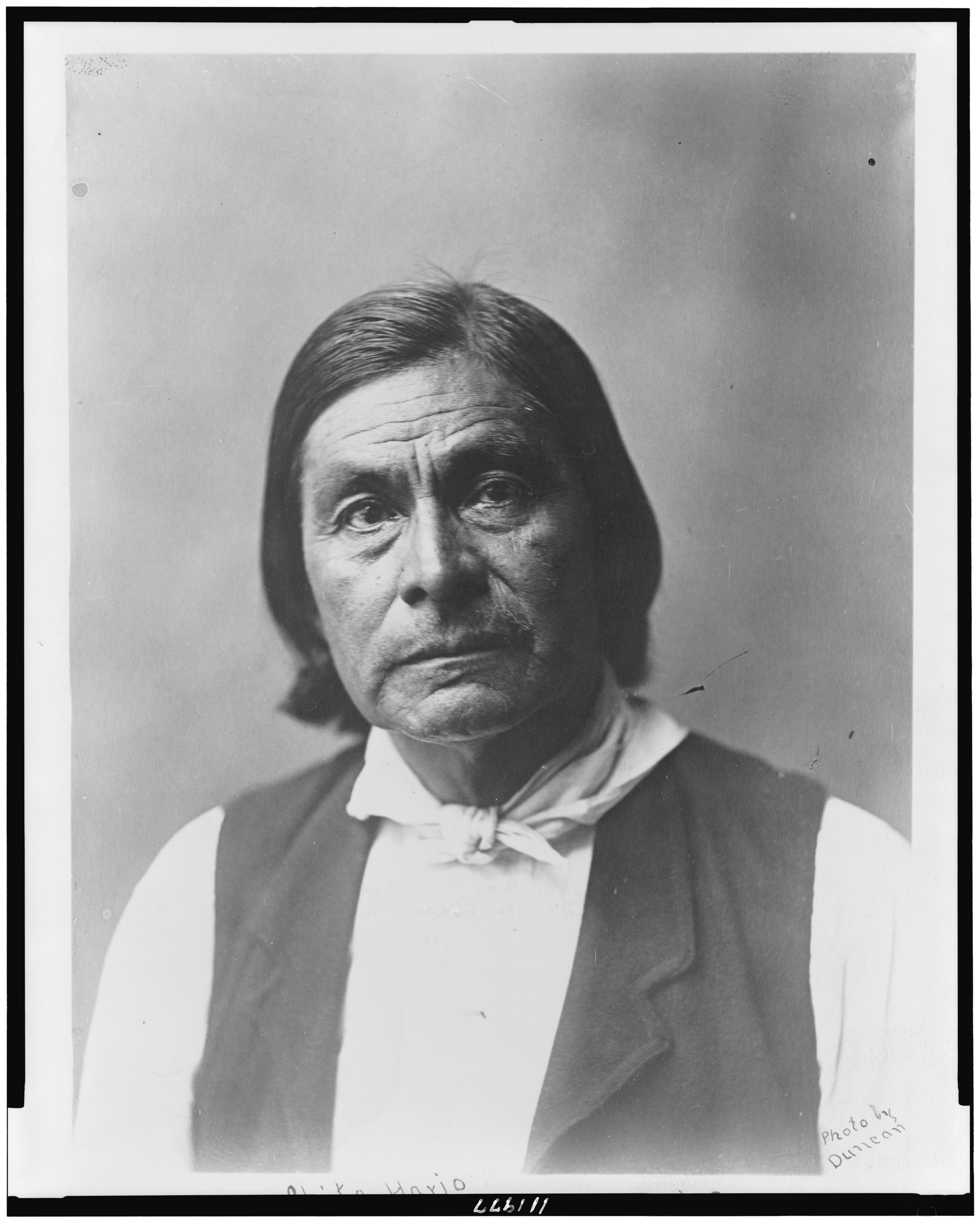
Chitto Harjo (Muscogee, c. 1846–c. 1912), leader of the 1909 Crazy Snake Uprising

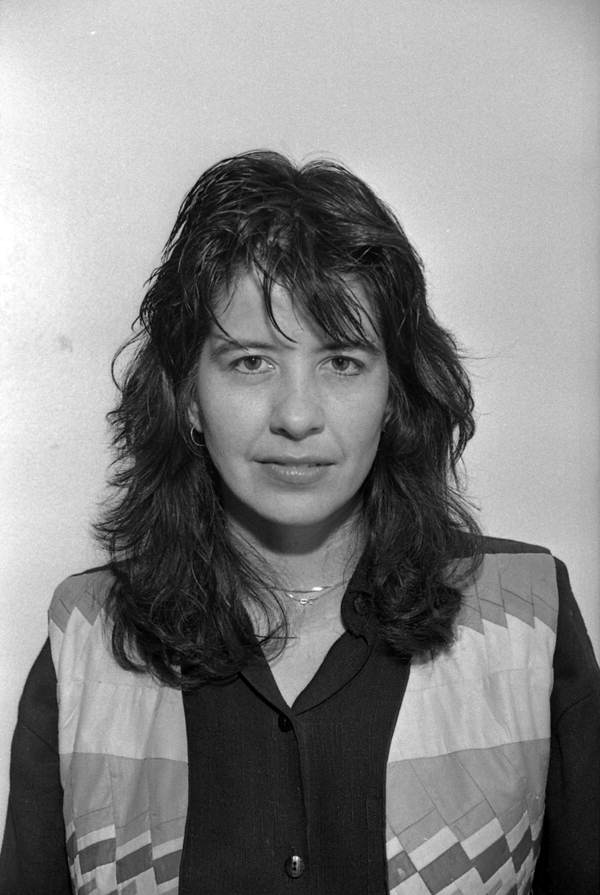
Former U.S. poet laureate Joy Harjo (Muscogee)

Notable people with the name include:

- Lois Harjo Ball (Muscogee, 1906–1982), painter
- Albert Harjo (1937–2019), Muscogee artist
- Benjamin Harjo, Jr. (1945–2023), Absentee Shawnee/Seminole painter and printmaker
- Chitto Harjo (Crazy Snake, c. 1846–c. 1912), Muscogee warrior and activist
- Edmond Harjo (1917–2014), American Seminole Code Talker during World War II
- Joy Harjo (born 1951), Muscogee poet, musician, author, and U.S. Poet Laureate
- Osvald Harjo (1910–1993), Norwegian resistance member
- Sharron Ahtone Harjo (born 1945), Kiowa painter
- Sterlin Harjo (born 1979), Seminole/Muscogee filmmaker, director, and comedian
- Suzan Shown Harjo (born 1945), Muscogee/Cheyenne activist and policymaker
- William Harjo LoneFight (Muscogee, born 1966), president and CEO of American Native Services

== See also ==
- Harjo, Oklahoma, unincorporated community in the United States
- Tahnee Ahtone, formerly Tahnee Ahtoneharjo-Growingthunder, Kiowa beadwork artist, regalia maker, curator, and museum professional of Muscogee and Seminole descent
- Harju, a Finno–Norwegian surname
- Tustenuggee, Muscogee for "war chief"
