= Redbird Smith, Oklahoma =

Redbird Smith, Oklahoma ᏙᏧᏩ ᎤᏕᏘᏱᏍᎬ (Cherokee)
- CDP
- Location within the state of Oklahoma
- Coordinates: 35°33′43″N 94°59′34″W
- Country: United States
- State: Oklahoma
- County: Sequoyah

Area
  - Total: 12.13 sq mi (31.41 km^{2})
  - Land: 12.03 sq mi (31.17 km^{2})
  - Water: 0.089 sq mi (0.23 km^{2})
- Elevation: 804 ft (245 m)

Population (2020)
  - Total: 526
  - Density: 43.7/sq mi (16.87/km^{2})
- Time zone: UTC-6 (Central (CST))
  - Summer (DST): UTC-5 (CDT)
- FIPS code: 40-62275
- GNIS feature ID: 2409151

Redbird Smith (Cherokee: ᏙᏧᏩ ᎤᏕᏘᏱᏍᎬ, romanized: Totsuwa Udetiyisgv) is a census-designated place (CDP) in Sequoyah County, Oklahoma, United States. It is part of the Fort Smith, Arkansas-Oklahoma Metropolitan Statistical Area. As of the 2020 census, Redbird Smith had a population of 526. It was named for Redbird Smith (Cherokee), who founded the Keetoowah Nighthawk Society in Indian Territory and established a ceremonial ground here for sacred rituals.

== Geography ==
According to the United States Census Bureau, the CDP has a total area of 12.1 square miles (31 km^{2}), of which 12.0 square miles (31 km^{2}) is land and 0.1 square miles (0.26 km^{2}) (0.74%) is water.

== Demographics ==
Historical population
Census	Pop.	Note	%±
2020	526		—
U.S. Decennial Census

=== 2020 census ===
As of the 2020 census, Redbird Smith had a population of 526. The median age was 48.4 years. 21.3% of residents were under the age of 18 and 25.9% of residents were 65 years of age or older. For every 100 females there were 101.5 males, and for every 100 females age 18 and over there were 101.0 males age 18 and over.

0.0% of residents lived in urban areas, while 100.0% lived in rural areas.

There were 201 households in Redbird Smith, of which 21.9% had children under the age of 18 living in them. Of all households, 57.2% were married-couple households, 19.4% were households with a male householder and no spouse or partner present, and 19.4% were households with a female householder and no spouse or partner present. About 20.8% of all households were made up of individuals and 15.5% had someone living alone who was 65 years of age or older.

There were 254 housing units, of which 20.9% were vacant. The homeowner vacancy rate was 1.5% and the rental vacancy rate was 0.0%.

Racial composition as of the 2020 census
Race	Number	Percent
White	331	62.9%
Black or African American	7	1.3%
American Indian and Alaska Native	117	22.2%
Asian	2	0.4%
Native Hawaiian and Other Pacific Islander	2	0.4%
Some other race	5	1.0%
Two or more races	62	11.8%
Hispanic or Latino (of any race)	17	3.2%

=== 2000 census ===
As of the census of 2000, there were 411 people, 153 households, and 117 families residing in the CDP. The population density was 34.3 inhabitants per square mile (13.2/km^{2}). There were 170 housing units at an average density of 14.2 per square mile (5.5/km^{2}). The racial makeup of the CDP was 75.91% White, 18.49% Native American, 0.24% Asian, and 5.35% from two or more races. Hispanic or Latino of any race were 1.22% of the population.

There were 153 households, out of which 32.0% had children under the age of 18 living with them, 63.4% were married couples living together, 7.8% had a female householder with no husband present, and 22.9% were non-families. 19.6% of all households were made up of individuals, and 6.5% had someone living alone who was 65 years of age or older. The average household size was 2.69 and the average family size was 3.13.

In the CDP, the population was spread out, with 30.2% under the age of 18, 4.1% from 18 to 24, 26.5% from 25 to 44, 27.5% from 45 to 64, and 11.7% who were 65 years of age or older. The median age was 37 years. For every 100 females, there were 116.3 males. For every 100 females age 18 and over, there were 106.5 males.

The median income for a household in the CDP was $35,563, and the median income for a family was $36,750. Males had a median income of $27,411 versus $17,500 for females. The per capita income for the CDP was $12,581. About 15.4% of families and 17.3% of the population were below the poverty line, including 24.3% of those under age 18 and 12.5% of those age 65 or over.

== See also ==
- Redbird Smith
