= Original Keetoowah Society =

Keetoowah religious organization

The Original Keetoowah Society is a 21st-century Keetoowah religious organization dedicated to preserving the culture and teachings of the Keetoowah Nighthawk Society (Cherokee: ᎩᏚᏩ ᎤᎾᏙᏢᎯ, romanized: Giduwa Unadotlvhi) in Oklahoma. It has been described as the surviving core of the Cherokee movement of religious nationalism originally led by Redbird Smith in the mid-nineteenth century. After the Cherokee were forced to move to Indian Territory, various groups associated with the Keetoowah Society worked to preserve traditional culture and its teachings.

The group now known as The Original Keetoowah Society is believed to have developed from an early 20th-century group known as the Keetoowah Nighthawk Society (or the Nighthawk Keetoowahs). One of the earliest records of the Keetoowah Movement post-Indian Removal is dated August 15, 1888.

== Origin of name ==
The term Keetoowah has been applied to various groups of Cherokee, and is sometimes thought to be an alternative term that the early indigenous people used for themselves as an autonym. Ethnologist James Mooney, in the following extract of a 1902 report for the Smithsonian's Bureau of American Ethnology, noted some background on the names by which the Cherokee peoples knew themselves, and were known by others, which included "Ani'-Kitu'hwagi", meaning "people of Kitu'hwa [Keetoowa]":

The proper name by which the Cherokee call themselves is ... Ani'-Yun'wiya' in the third person, signifying "real people," or "principal people"... The word properly denotes "Indians," as distinguished from people of other races, but in usage it is restricted to mean members of the Cherokee tribe, those of other tribes being designated as Creek, Catawba, etc., as the case may be. On ceremonial occasions they frequently speak of themselves as Ani'-Kitu'hwagi, or "people of Kitu'hwa," an ancient settlement on the Tuckasegee River and apparently the original nucleus of the tribe.

The Tuckasegee River is in western North Carolina.

Court clerk and reporter John Springston, a Keetoowah Society member from the Saline District in the Cherokee Nation before Oklahoma statehood, notes the use of the Keetoowah name prior to Indian removal from the southeast, saying, "Back in Georgia from whence the Cherokees originally migrated to the Indian Territory in 1838 and 1839, the old Keetoowah group was dying out as early as 1835."

== Late 19th-century activities ==
What was known as the Keetoowah band regrouped after the Cherokee were removed to Indian Territory. During the late 19th century, various groups formed that claimed connection to the Keetoowah band or society, the most conservative group among the people.

Under pressure from European-American encroachment and application of the 1887 Dawes Act to their lands, the Keetoowah and other Cherokee were alarmed by the rulings in two court cases, Cherokee Nation v. Southern Kansas R. R. (1890) and Cherokee Nation v. Journeycake (1894), which demonstrated that the Cherokee were losing the power to control their own territory.

The Society convened in Tahlequah in 1899 to pass resolutions critical of the Cherokee Council and the Dawes Commission. They opposed federal plans to break up communal tribal land by allotting it in 160-acre parcels to individual households of Cherokee citizens. In order to do that, the Dawes Commission was planning to register all members of the Cherokee nation, although they had not agreed to this. The other of the Five Civilized Tribes in Indian Territory were under the same pressure to have their people registered and land allotted.

Given the factions, different groups challenged amendments to their constitution that would have enabled the work of the Dawes Commission. Some resolved to register, or enroll as tribal members, only under protest. "The Keetoowah in convention at Big Tucker Springs on 6 September 1901 decided to enroll with the Dawes Commission, leading {sic} to a final schism between Keetoowah factions. Redbird Smith left the meeting with eleven of his traditionalist supporters to resist enrollment actively, forming the Nighthawk Keetoowah."

Several hundred Keetoowah Indians, including several groups that started out as members of the Keetoowah Society and left with the Nighthawks in 1901, formed a number of secret, traditionalist, exclusive factions. Most of these groups started near Gore, Vian, or Proctor, and adjoining areas. These groups were nascent within the Keetoowah Society as early as 1893. They derived from the Goingsnake clan fire or various of the Four Mothers Nation fires. Like the Nighthawks, these groups generally refused until 1910 or later to accept the work of the Dawes Commission.

While they intended to maintain tribal government and functions regardless of the fate of the Cherokee Nation, the Keetoowah as a body officially acquiesced under protest to the legislative provisions that dissolved the Cherokee Nation's government and allotted communal lands to individual households, extinguishing the tribal land claims. They learned that they could not prevent the 1893 Act, the Dawes Commission enrollment, U. S. citizenship, the Curtis Act and the abolition of tribal courts, the Agreement with the Cherokee Nation of April 1, 1900; the 1906 Act and the virtual political dissolution of the corrupt Cherokee government as of 4 March 1906, presidential approval for all tribal ordinances affecting tribal or individual lands after allotment, and the allotment in severalty [the condition of being separate] of Cherokee lands.

== 1930s and tribal reorganization ==
"John Smith, the most influential Nighthawk leader among Redbird Smith's sons, had lost virtually all credibility among Keetoowahs by the 1930s." He had supported Chester Polk Cornelius, an Oneida who had "engaged them in speculative schemes", leading to splintering of the religious group into multiple factions. As a result, two different and opposing ceremonial grounds were established by the Keetoowah Society, although each was run by members of Redbird Smith's family: at the grounds of Redbird and Stokes Smith. Other related groups claiming Keetoowah status were known as the Goingsnake "Seven Clans" fire, the Medicine Springs Fire or Medicine Society, and the Four Mothers Nation.

== Keetoowah Society divergence ==
Other political factions arose among the Keetoowah. During the 1930s, the majority of Keetoowah factions supported the idea of reorganizing the Keetoowah Cherokee in all the old clan districts to apply for self-government as a united Band under the proposed 1934 Indian Reorganization Act. The United Keetoowah Band of Cherokee Indians gained federal recognition as a tribe in 1950.

The Cherokees by Blood, representing all Cherokee descendants, rather than Keetoowah alone, failed in 1932 to obtain standing as a party to the Cherokee claims litigation. The Cherokee Nation of Oklahoma gained federal recognition in 1970 and has by far the larger membership.
