= Chitto Harjo =

Muscogee native American leader

- Cetto Haco
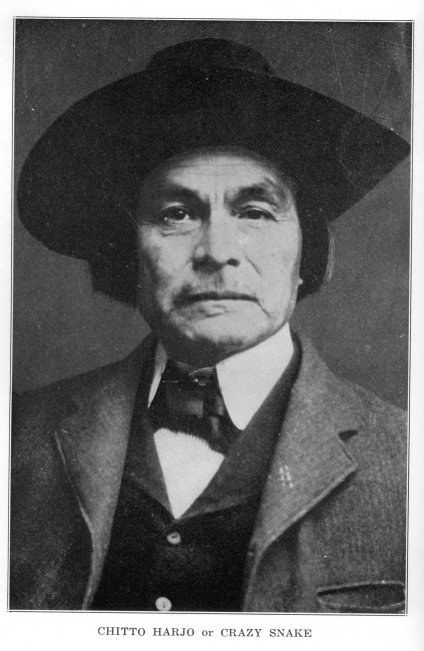
- Portrait of Chitto Harjo, c. 1900
- Born: c. 1846; Arbeka, Muscogee (Creek) Nation, Indian Territory (now Oklahoma)
- Died: April 5, 1911 (aged 64–65); Smithville, McCurtain County, Oklahoma, U.S.
- Resting place: Bobb Family Cemetery, Smithville, Oklahoma, U.S.
- Other names: Crazy Snake, Wilson Jones, Bill Jones, Bill Snake, Bill Harjo, Eufala Harjo
- Occupations: Orator, traditionalist leader, activist, farmer
- Known for: Leading the anti-allotment Crazy Snake Movement
- Parent: Aharlock Harjo (father)
- Military career
- Allegiance: United States (during the Civil War); Muscogee (Creek) Nation
- Branch: Union Army

Chitto Harjo (Creek: Cetto Haco, also known as Crazy Snake, Wilson Jones, Bill Jones, Bill Snake, and Bill Harjo; c. 1846 – April 5, 1911) was a leader and orator among the traditionalists in the Muscogee Creek Nation in Indian Territory at the turn of the 20th century. He resisted changes which the US government and local leaders wanted to impose to achieve statehood for what became Oklahoma. These included extinguishing tribal governments and civic institutions and breaking up communal lands into allotments to individual households, with United States sales of the "surplus" to European-American and other settlers. He was the leader of the Crazy Snake Rebellion on March 25, 1909 in Oklahoma. At the time this was called the last "Indian uprising".

== Early life ==
Born in the Muscogee Creek Nation in Indian Territory after the tribe was removed from Alabama in the 1830s, Wilson Jones was a Muscogee Creek Indian. He was better known by his Creek name of Chitto Harjo, meaning "Crazy Snake." Cetto means "snake" and Haco means "to be brave without regard for one's personal well being or 'crazy brave'." He was a traditionalist, belonging to the minority of the tribe who remained loyal to the Union during the American Civil War.

Later in the century, traditionalists worked to reinstate the tribal government of 1867 and to enforce treaty rights with the United States. They opposed the extinguishing of government and allotment of lands to households under the Dawes Commission.

== Career ==
While a young man, Chitto Harjo was allied with the federalists or Loyalists led by Opothleyahola, who moved the group to Kansas in 1861 with the start of the American Civil War. They remained loyal to the Union when most Creek allied with the Confederacy. He and many of these Creek men were recruited to the Union Army and served with federal forces in the Civil War. In testimony in 1906, he said that he had believed this service, in a war between the white men and one which did not concern the Indians, would help ensure the maintenance of government promises to his people. The Civil War divided the tribe, as many Creek were allied with the Confederacy.

In the late 19th century, the Muscogee Creek and other American Indian tribes in Indian Territory were pressured to change by the US government, in part to make way for a demand for statehood by European-American settlers in parts of the territory. There was national legislation to extinguish tribal government and to establish individual household allotments of land in place of tribal communal holdings. Congress created the Dawes Commission in 1896 to carry out the allotment of lands for the Five Civilized Tribes. The Dawes Rolls were the registries of tribal members who were eligible to receive allotments. These became a record of tribal members.

Chitto Harjo was a leader in the Four Mothers Society, an intertribal religious movement. This group sought to revive the traditional practices and solidarity between related tribes that had been relocated to Oklahoma from the southeastern United States. In 1900 a meeting at Harjo's ceremonial grounds of Old Hickory declared the chief Pleasant Porter deposed for having violated the 1867 Creek Constitution while cooperating with the allotment process. They selected Chitto Harjo as the new principal chief of the Creek. They founded a police force, known as Lighthorse, and attempted to dissuade the Creek from accepting allotment of lands.

From 1900 to 1909, Chitto Harjo led Creek resistance to the assimilation changes. The Green Peach War took place in 1901, and Isparhecher retired. He had been a judge in the Okmulgee District and leader of Loyalists. Harjo led those Creek who opposed cultural assimilation and allotment. As the US was trying to extinguish tribal government, Crazy Snake and his followers set up a separate government for a time at the old Hickory Stomp Grounds southeast of Okmulgee.

Chitto Harjo and others were arrested and convicted in US court and imprisoned briefly. They were released on parole. During the next five years, the majority of the tribe accepted the changes and were allotted individual plots of land, in preparation for the territory to be admitted to statehood as Oklahoma. Chitto Harjo and other Snakes refused to choose their allotments.

In 1906 members of a Special Senate Investigating Committee visited the Indian Territory to learn more about the issues and why some of the Muscogee Creek people were resisting changes. Harjo, as a recognized leader of the traditionalists, testified at length to the senators. His speech to the US Congress in 1906 is considered an eloquent statement regarding US treatment of Indian peoples. It is often quoted for the phrase, "as long as the grass grows", used in regard to the promised perpetuity of Indian treaties and agreements with the US government.

In 1909, after Oklahoma had achieved statehood and passed Jim Crow laws like those of neighboring states of Arkansas and Texas, a group of African Americans came to Harjo's grounds seeking refuge. They had faced discrimination and been driven out of other parts of Oklahoma. During the time of the March meeting of the Four Mothers Society, local European-Americans said that a piece of smoked meat had been stolen from them. Fearing an alliance between the Creek and the African Americans, they called together a white posse to break up the black encampment. A melee ensued in which one black man was killed, a white man wounded, and 42 blacks were arrested and jailed.

Whites began to get arms, wanting to break up the Creek-black encampment and to arrest Chitto Harjo, known as a conservative leader. When a group went to his house, a gun battle broke out. Two white deputies were quickly killed and others were wounded; Harjo and his followers escaped to the old Choctaw Nation. They were helped by fellow members of the Four Mothers Society. This became known as the "Crazy Snake Rebellion".

The Oklahoma governor, "Charles N. Haskell, ordered a militia to pursue the Creek conservatives and restore order in McIntosh and Okmulgee counties." The commanding officer found that whites were causing most of the problem and forced the disbanding of posses in the area. Harjo took refuge with Daniel Bob, a Choctaw conservative leader, in McCurtain County, Oklahoma. He died in 1911, without being seen again by white enforcers.

== Address to US Senate committee ==
Chitto Harjo, under the name Eufala Harjo, testified before the Select Committee of the Senate. Harjo, along with several representatives of Cherokee, Creek, and other tribes strongly opposed breaking up tribal land into individual allotments. Harjo told a Senate investigating committee that "I will never stop asking for this treaty, the old treaty that our fathers made with the Government which gave us this land forever ... as long as the grass grows, water runs, and the sun rises."

Harjo gave this further testimony:

"I will begin with a recital of the relations of the Creeks with the Government of the United States from 1861 and I will explain it so you will understand it. I look to that time—to the treaties of the Creek Nation with the United States—and I abide by the provisions of the treaty made by the Creek Nation with the Government in 1861. I would like to enquire what had become of the relations between the Indians and the white people from 1492 down to 1861?

"My ancestors and my people were the inhabitants of this great country from 1492. I mean by that from the time the white man first came to this country until now. It was my home and the home of my people from time immemorial and is today, I think, the home of my people. Away back in that time—in 1492—there was man by the name of Columbus came from across the great ocean [Atlantic] and he discovered this country for the white man—this country which was at that time the home of my people. What did he find when he first arrived here? Did he find a white man standing on this continent then or did he find a black man standing here? Did he find either a black man or a white man standing on this continent? I stood here first and Columbus first discovered me.

"I want to know what did he say to the red man at that time? He was on one of the great four roads that led to light. At that time Columbus received the information that was given to him by my people. My ancestor informed him that he was ready to accept this light he proposed to give him and walk these four roads of light and have his children under his direction. He told him it was all right. He told him, 'The land is all yours; the law is all yours'. He said it is all right. He told him, 'I will always take care of you. If your people meet with any troubles, I will take these troubles away. I will stand before you and behind you and on each side of you and your people, and if any people come into your country I will take them away and you shall live in peace under me. My arms,' he said, 'are very long'. He told him to come within his protecting arms and he said, 'If anything comes against you for your ruin I will stand by you and preserve you and defend you and protect you.'

"'There is a law,' he said at that time, 'that is above every other law and that is away up yonder—high up—for,' said he, 'if any other town or nation or any other tribe come against you I will see through that law that you are protected. It does not make any difference to you,' he said, 'if as many as twelve other nations come against you or twelve other tribes come against you it will not make any difference for I will combine with you and protect you and overthrow them all. I will protect you in all things and take care of everything about your existence so you will live in this land that is yours and your fathers' without fear.' That is what he said and we agreed upon those terms. He told me that as long as the sun shone and the sky is up yonder these agreements shall be kept. This was the first agreement that we had with the white man. He said as long as the sun rises it shall last; as long as the waters run it shall last; as long as the grass grows it shall last. That was what it was to be and we agreed upon those terms. That was what the agreement was and we signed our names to that agreement and to those terms. He said, 'Just as long as you see light here; just as long as you see this light glimmering over us, shall these agreements be kept and not until all these things shall cease and pass away shall our agreement pass away.' That is what he said and we believed it. I think there is nothing that has been done by the people should abrogate them. We have kept every term of that agreement. The grass is growing, the waters run, the sun shines, the light is with us and the agreement is with us yet for the God that is above us all witnessed that agreement. He said to me that whoever did anything against me was doing it against him and against the agreement and he said if anyone attempted to do anything against me, to notify him for whatever was done against me was against him and therefore against the agreement. He said that he would send good men amongst us to teach us about his God and to treat them good for they were his representatives and to listen to them and if anyone attempted to molest us to, tell them (the missionaries) and they would tell him. He told me that he would protect me in all ways; that he would take care of my people and look after them; that he would succor them if they needed succor and be their support at all times and I told him it was all right and he wrote the agreement that way.

"Now, coming down to 1832 and referring to the agreements between the Creek people and the Government of the United States; What has occurred since 1832 until today? It seems that some people forget what has occurred. After all, we are all one blood; we have the one God and we live in the same land. I had always lived back yonder in what is now the State of Alabama. We had our homes back there; my people had their homes back there. We had our troubles back there and we had no one to defend us. At that time when I had these troubles, it was to take my country away from me. I had no other troubles. The troubles were always about taking my country from me. I could live in peace with all else, but they wanted my country and I was in trouble defending it. It was no use. They were bound to take my country away from me. It may have been that my country had to, be taken away from me, but it was not justice. I have always been asking for justice. I have never asked for anything else but justice. I never had justice. First, it was this and then it was something else that was taken away from me and my people, so we couldn't stay there any more. It was not because a man had to stand on the outside of what was right that brought the troubles. What was to be done was all set out yonder in the light and all men knew what the law and the agreement was. It was a treaty—a solemn treaty—but what difference did that make? I want to say this to you today, because I don't want these ancient agreements between the Indian and the white man violated and I went as far as Washington and had them sustained and made treaties about it. We made terms of peace, for it had been war, but we made new terms of peace and made new treaties. Then it was the overtures of the Government to my people to leave their land, the home of their fathers, the land that they loved. He said, 'It will be better for you to do as I want, for these old treaties cannot be kept any longer.' He said, 'You look away off to the West, away over backward and there you will see a great river called the Mississippi River and away over beyond that is another river called the Arkansas River.' And he said, 'You go way out there and you will find a land that is fair to look upon and is fertile, and you go there with your people and I will give that country to you and your people forever.' He said, 'Go way out there beyond these two rivers; away out the direction of the setting sun and select your land—what you want of it—and I will locate you and your people there and I will give you that land forever and I will protect you and your children in it forever.' That was the agreement and the treaty and I and my people came out here and settled on this land and I carried out these agreements and treaties in all points and violated none. I came over and located here.

"What took place in 1861? I had made my home here with my people and I was living well out here with my people. We were all prospering. We had a great deal of property here, all over this country. We had come here and taken possession of it under our treaty. We had laws that were living laws and I was living here under then laws. You are my fathers and I tell you that in 1861, I was living here in peace and plenty with my people and we were happy; and then my white fathers rose in arms against each other to, fight each other. They did fight each other. At that day Abraham Lincoln was President of the United States and our Great Father. He was in Washington and I was away off down here. My white brothers divided into factions and went to war. When the white people raised in arms and tried to destroy one another, it was not for the purpose of destroying my people at all. It was not for the purpose of destroying treaties with the Indians. They did not think of that and the Indian was not the cause of that great war at all. The cause of that war was because there was a people that were black in skin and color who had always been in slavery. In my old home in Alabama and all through the south part of the Nation and out in this country, these black people were held in slavery and up in the North there were no slaves. The people of that part of the United States determined to set the black man free and the people in the South determined that they should not and they went to war about it. In that war the Indians had not any part. It was not their war at all. The purpose of the war was to set these black people at liberty and I had nothing to, do with it. He told me to come out here and have my laws back, and I came out here with my people and had my own laws and was living under them. On account of some of your own sons—the ancient brothers of mine—they came over here and caused me to enroll along with my people on your side. I left my home and my country and everything I had in the world and went rolling on toward the Federal Army. I left my laws and my government; I left my people and my country and my home; I left everything and went with the Federal Army for my father in Washington. I left them in order to stand by my treaties. I left everything and I arrived in Kansas—I mean it was at Leavenworth where I arrived. It was a town away up in Kansas on the Missouri River. I arrived at Fort Leavenworth to do what I could for my father's country and stand by my treaties. There at Fort Leavenworth was the orator of the Federal Army and I went and fell before the orator of the Federal Army. It was terrible hard times with me then. In that day I was under the Sons of my father in Washington. I was with the Federal soldiers. "I am speaking now of this orator in the Federal Army. I went and fell before him and I and my people joined the Federal Army because we wanted to, keep our treaties with the father in Washington. Things should not have been that way but that is the way they were. The father at Washington was not able to keep his treaty with me and I had to leave my country, as I have stated, and go into the Federal Army. I went in as a Union soldier. When I took the oath, I raised my hand and called God to witness that I was ready to die in the cause that was right and to help my father defend his treaties. All this time the fire was going on and the war and the battles were going on, and today I have conquered all and regained these treaties that I have with the Government. I believe that everything wholly and fully came back to me on account of the position I took in that war. I think that. I thought then and I think today that is the way to do—to stand up and be a man that keeps his word all the time and under all circumstances. That is what I did and I know that in doing so I regained again all my old treaties for the father at Washington conquered in that war and he promised me that if I was faithful to, my treaties, I should have them all back again. I was faithful to my treaties and I got them all back again and today I am living under them and with them. I never agreed to the exchanging of lands and I never agreed to the allotting of my lands. I knew it would never do for my people and I never could say a b c so far as that is concerned. I never knew anything about English. I can't speak the tongue. I can't read it. I can't write it. I and my people, great masses of them, are unenlightened and uneducated. I am notifying you of these things because your Government officials have told me and my people that they would take care of my relations with the Government and I think they ought to be taking care of them as they promised. He said that if anyone trespassed on my rights or questioned them to let him know and he would take care of them and protect them. I always thought that this would be done. I believe yet it will be done. I don't know what the trouble is now. I don't know anything about it. I think my lands are all cut up. I have never asked that be done but I understand it has been done. I don't know why it was done. My treaty said that it never would be done unless I wanted it done. That anything I did not want to be done contrary to that treaty would not be done. I never made these requests. I went through death for this cause and I now hold the release this Government gave me. I served the father faithfully and as a reward, I regained my country back again and I and my children will remain on it and live upon it as we did in the old time. I believe it. I know it is right. I know it is justice.

"I hear the Government is cutting up my land and is giving it away to black people. I want to know if this is so. It can't be so for it is not in the treaty. These black people, who are they? They are negroes who came in here as slaves. They have no right to this land. It never was given to them. It was given to me and my people and we paid for it with our land back in Alabama. The black people have no right to it. Then can it be that the Government is giving it—my land—to the negro? I hear it is and they are selling it. This can't be so. It wouldn't be justice. I am informed and believe it to be true that some citizens of the United States have title to land that was given to my fathers and my people by the Government. If it was given to me, what right has the United States to take it from me without first asking my consent? That I would like to know. There are many things that I don't know and can't understand but I want to understand them if I can. I believe the officers of the United States ought to take care of the rights of me and my people first and then afterwards look out for their own interests. I have reason to believe and I do believe that they are more concerned in their own welfare than the welfare of rights of the Indian—lots of them are. I believe some of them are honest men, but not many. A plan ought fiat to dispossess himself of all thought or wish to do me or my country wrong. He should never think of doing wrong to this country or to the rights of my people. After he has done that, then maybe he can do something for himself in that regard; but first he must protect the Indians and their rights in this country. He is the servant of the Government and he is sent here to, do that and he should not be permitted to do anything else.

"All that I am begging of you, Honorable Senators, is that these ancient agreements and treaties wherein you promised to take care of me and my people, be fulfilled and that you will remove all the difficulties that have been raised in reference to my people and their country and I ask you to see that these promises are faithfully kept. I understand you are the representatives of the Government sent here to look into these things and I hope you will relieve us. That is all I desire to say."

In response to, an interrogatory by the Chairman of the Committee, the old Indian responded, "Oh, yes, I am a farmer. I have a farm and a home there on it. I used to have horses and hogs and cattle but I have precious few left now. The white people have run all through me and over me and around me and committed all kinds of depredations and what I have left is precious few. I am here and stand before you today, my fathers, as a man of misery. I am here appealing to you to have the laws carried out."

Senator Teller of the Committee enquired of Mr. Hodge, the interpreter, "Do you believe that the old man is honest in his statements?" Mr. Hodge very readily and with emphasis answered, "Yes sir, he is as honest and straight forward and sincere in his statements as a living man can be."

(Records of the Special Senate Investigating Committee For Indian Territory, November 23, 1906)
