= Stomp dance =

Eastern Native American ceremonial dance

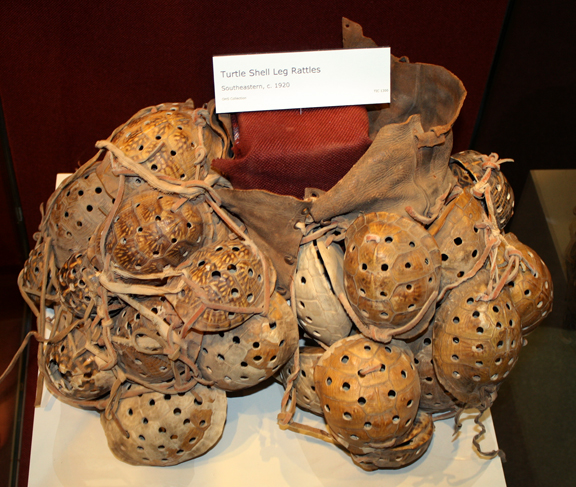
Southeastern turtleshell rattles, worn on the legs while dancing, c. 1920, Oklahoma History Center

The stomp dance is performed by various Eastern Woodland tribes and Native American communities in the United States, including the Muscogee, Yuchi, Cherokee, Chickasaw, Choctaw, Delaware, Miami, Caddo, Tuscarora, Ottawa, Quapaw, Peoria, Shawnee, Seminole, Natchez, and Seneca-Cayuga tribes. Stomp dance communities are active in Georgia, North Carolina, Oklahoma, Alabama, Mississippi, and Florida.

== Names and etymology ==
The English term stomp dance refers to the "shuffle and stomp" movements of the dance. In the Muskogee language the dance is called opvnkv haco, which can mean "drunken", "crazy" or "inspirited" dance. This usually refers to the exciting, yet meditative effect the dance and the medicine have on the participants. In the Shawnee language, the dance is called nikanikawe which refers to a dance involving friends or Nekon. It is also called the "leading dance" by many Shawnees, but most simply call it the "stomp dance". In the Caddo language, the dance is called kakiʔtihánnakah, while in Cherokee it is known as gatiyo alisgisdi (Cherokee: ᎦᏘᏲ ᎠᎵᏍᎩᏍᏗ).

== Structure and function of a stomp dance society ==
Among Muscogee Creeks and Four Mothers Society members, the stomp dance grounds contain an elevated square platform with the flat edges of the square facing the cardinal directions. Arbors are constructed upon the flat edges of the square in which the men sit facing one of the four directions. This is formally referred to as the Square Ground, which is encircled by a ring-mound of earth. In the center of this is the ceremonial fire, which is referred to by many names including "mother" fire. Ceremonially, this fire is the focus of the songs and prayers of the people and is considered to be a living sacred being.

Outside of the circle of earth, surrounding the Square Ground are the community's clan-houses. These houses are casually referred to as "camps" and depending on the traditional level and financial situation of the community may be relatively nice cottages, shanties or in between. Prior to the dance dinner is prepared in these family camps. Throughout the night guests that arrive are welcomed to help eat up the leftovers. The foods eaten at stomp dances are typical southern delicacies such as corn bread, mashed potatoes as well as certain specialized Indian dishes such as sofkee, pashofa, grape or lye dumplings, hominy, and numerous traditional dishes.

Kituwah stomp dance grounds are encircled by seven clan arbors. These are influenced by the traditionalist revival among Cherokees during the late 19th century, inspired by Redbird Smith. In 1907, 22 ceremonial grounds were active on Cherokee lands in Oklahoma.

Stickball games are often played at stomp dance grounds. Yuchi stomp dances are held in conjunction with their ritual football games. Especially in Oklahoma, different tribes will participate in each other's dances.

== Leadership ==
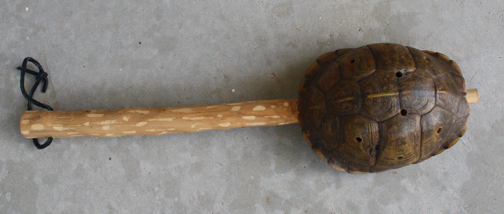
Turtleshell rattle made by Tommy Wildcat

A traditional stomp dance grounds is often headed by a male elder. In the Creek and Seminole traditions, the mekko or "king" [chief] is the primary ceremonial authority. The mekko is assisted by his second in charge called a henehv, the chief medicine man called a heleshayv and speaker called opunayv. Mekkos are not supposed to publicly address the entire grounds and as such that responsibility falls often on opunayv. A traditional Creek grounds also employs four tvstvnvkvlke (warchiefs/generals/police), four head ladies and four alternate head ladies.

== Ceremony ==
A night of dancing typically starts well after dark and continues until dawn of the next day, with many rounds of dancing throughout the night. Participants who are making a religious commitment to the ceremony will begin fasting after midnight, "touch medicine" at four different times during night, and are obligated to stay awake the whole night. The medicine is made from specific roots and plants which have been ceremonially gathered by selected "medicine helpers" and prepared by the Heles Haya at dawn of the morning of the Dance. This medicine is intended for the physical and spiritual benefit of the members of the dance at the ceremonial ground.

One of the male members of the community is given the job of calling out each song leader and all other participants to dance for each round. Each round is led by a selected man who has developed his own sequence of songs from the multitude of variations on traditional rhythms, melodies and lyrics, sometimes with personalized content in the mix. The songs are typically performed in call and response form, in the native language. Every dance must have at least one woman with shakers, who falls into step immediately behind the song leader, to carry the rhythm. The remaining dancers follow, alternating male-female in a continuous spiral around the central fire, with visitors, then young children, and the odd numbers trailing at the end. The dancers circle the fire in counterclockwise direction with deliberate stomping steps set to the rhythm created by the women with their shell shakers. Depending on the size of the community and the number of visitors in attendance, the number of people joining the circle may range from less than ten up to several hundred. Usually a round of dancing continues until at least four songs are completed by the dance leader, and then everyone returns to their seats until another singer is called on to "lead out". There is usually a few minutes of rest between each leader, but the breaks may stretch longer if there are fewer people present to participate. The stomp dance is not meant to be a grueling and physically challenging event, but almost every participant on the grounds will dance most of the night.

== Dance grounds ==
Although not as widespread as they were in the past, there are still many ceremonial grounds, or stomp grounds, located in what is now the southeastern United States and Oklahoma, where so many of the southeastern peoples were forced to move during the 1800s. Stokes Smith Stomp Dance Ground, which is located in an isolated area of the Cherokee Nation tribal lands, is one of approximately seven active Cherokee grounds. The Eastern Band Cherokee stomp grounds is currently located in Raven's Roost, North Carolina, on the Qualla Boundary. The Echota Ceremonial Ground has been located in Park Hill, Oklahoma since 2001. There is one active Tuscarora arbor located adjacent to the Tuscarora Nation Longhouse in the rural community of Prospect, North Carolina. The Creek tribe today has 16 active ceremonial grounds located throughout northeast Oklahoma. One of which is Flat Rock, located west of Eufaula and south of Mill Creek. Other active communities include Hossossv Tvlvhvse Ceremonial Ground on the Poarch Creek Indian Reservation near Atmore, Alabama, Kvnfvske Etvlwv in Fountain, Florida, and the White Oak Shawnee Tribe's grounds.

== Music ==
Men sing stomp dance songs in a call-and-answer format. A leader is chosen for a song and the other men provided a chorus. For some dances, the male dance leader carries a handheld rattle – commonly made from box turtle shells, gourds or coconuts. Women provide the primary rhythm accompaniment with shakers worn on their legs, which are traditionally made from turtle shells as well, but may also be made from condensed milk cans. During certain dances, a water drum can be used. Ethnomusicologist Victoria Lindsay Levine writes that, "Stomp dance songs are among the most exhilarating and dramatic musical genres in Native America."

== Attire ==
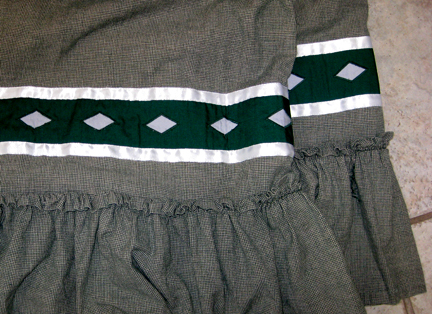
Detail of a stomp dance skirt made by Ardina Moore (Osage-Quapaw), featuring rattlesnake-patterned ribbon work

The dress of most stomp dancers is casual but nice. Most stomp dancers keep special attire for ceremonial occasions, but the physical nature of the dance and summery, outdoor conditions of the dance make comfort more important than flair. Women wear skirts and blouses that usually incorporate traditional patterns. The men wear blue jeans or slacks and hats, which are usually cowboy or ballcap styles, usually with a single eagle, hawk or crane feather in the hatband. The ribbon shirt is the standard ceremonial attire for both men and women, which consists of a loose-fitted tunic decorated with ribbons. Cherokee women typically wear full cotton skirts featuring ribbonwork in a rattlesnake pattern.

The women wear tortoise shell shakers, or shackles, on both legs (typically six to 12 on each leg). The shakers are hollowed out tortoise shells which have holes drilled in them and are filled with certain river rocks that will make them rattle. The traditional Creek and Seminole shell shakers are made of terrapin or box turtle shells. Lydia Sam, a Natchez-Cherokee traditionalist, was the first to dance with tin, condensed milk can leg shackles in the 1920s. Some ground leaders insist on the use of the terrapin by head lady shell shakers. This tradition continues today and most women start out with a set of "cans" before moving up to having their own set of shells. Women stomp dancers are called "shell shakers" or "turtles".

== Etiquette ==
Participants and visitors to a stomp dance ground cannot be under the influence of alcohol or drugs. Depending upon the grounds, they cannot have partaken of either for a prescribed period of time before or after the dance. Photography is not allowed at ceremonial dances. The ceremonies are religious, and many participants do not feel comfortable discussing details with visitors that are not part of the tribe, particularly in regards to medicine. Pregnant or menstruating women do not enter the dance circle at ceremonial grounds. Depending on the ground, they may or may not touch medicine.

== Secular stomp dances ==
During the off-season, stomp dances are sometimes performed indoors to avoid the winter cold. Some societies incorporate stomp dance into pow wows or as educational demonstrations. Caddos, Delaware, and other Woodland and Southern tribes have a secular or social stomp dance tradition. The Choctaw Nation of Oklahoma currently maintains non-ceremonial grounds for stomp dances and stickball. Chickasaws, on the other hand, maintain a ceremonial ground for stomp dances and stickball that doesn't use medicine. This is because, over years of assimilation through American Indian boarding schools, there were few medicine men left to doctor the ground (located at Kali Homma', near Allen, Oklahoma). The Chickasaws host four dances at Kali Homma' each summer. They also celebrate Chickasaw Reunion here, which is a festival held in place of the busk ceremony held by Chickasaws until 1936.

== See also ==
- Native American music
- Turkey dance
