= Keetoowah Nighthawk Society =

Nationalist organisation for preserving Cherokee spiritual beliefs

Keetoowah Nighthawk Society ᎩᏚᏩ ᎤᎾᏙᏢᎯ
- Abbreviation: KNS
- Leader: None
- Founder: Redbird Smith
- Founded: 1858; 168 years ago (original form); 1900; 126 years ago (current form)
- Dissolved: 1889; 137 years ago
- Succeeded by: Redbird Movement
- Headquarters: Tahlequah, Oklahoma
- Ideology: Cherokee nationalism Religious nationalism Cultural revitalization Formerly: Anti-allotment; Anti-assimilation
- Political position: Centrism
- Religion: Cherokee spiritualism
- Colors: Orange and Green

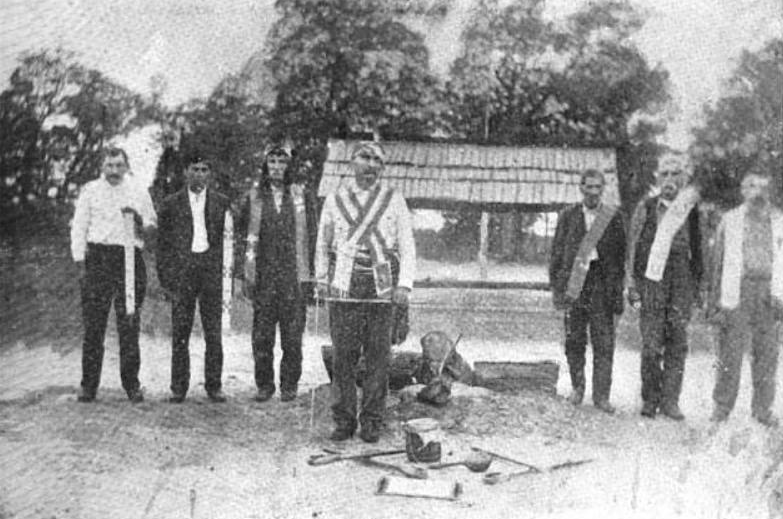
The Council of the Keetoowah Nighthawk Society, 1916, from Starr (1921).

The Keetoowah Nighthawk Society (Cherokee: ᎩᏚᏩ ᎤᎾᏙᏢᎯ, romanized: Giduwa Unadotlvhi) was a Cherokee nationalist organisation formed in 1858 and re-established ca. 1900 that intended to preserve and practice traditional Cherokee spiritual beliefs and "old ways" of tribal life, based on religious nationalism. It was led by Redbird Smith, a Cherokee National Council and original Keetoowah Society member. It formed in the Indian Territory that was superseded by admission of Oklahoma as a state, during the late-nineteenth century period when the federal government was breaking up tribal governments and communal lands under the Dawes Act and Curtis Act. The Nighthawks arose in response to weakening resolve on the part of Cherokee leaders—including the original Keetoowah Society (Cherokee: ᎩᏚᏩ ᎤᎾᏙᏢᎯ), a political organization created by Cherokee Native American full bloods, in 1858—to continue their resistance on behalf of the Cherokee after the Dawes Commission began forcing the transfer of Oklahoma tribal lands in the Indian Territory to individual ownership in the 1890s (a process termed allotment).

Soon after forming, the Keetoowah Nighthawk Society grew to as many as 5,500 members, but they could not forestall the changes made by the Dawes Commission. In 1900 its representatives came to an allotment agreement with Cherokee leaders. After doing so, the Commission enrolled the generally non-compliant Nighthawks in the tribe without obtaining their consents, and registered them for allotments. In 1902, Redbird Smith was arrested and also compelled to enroll for allotment.

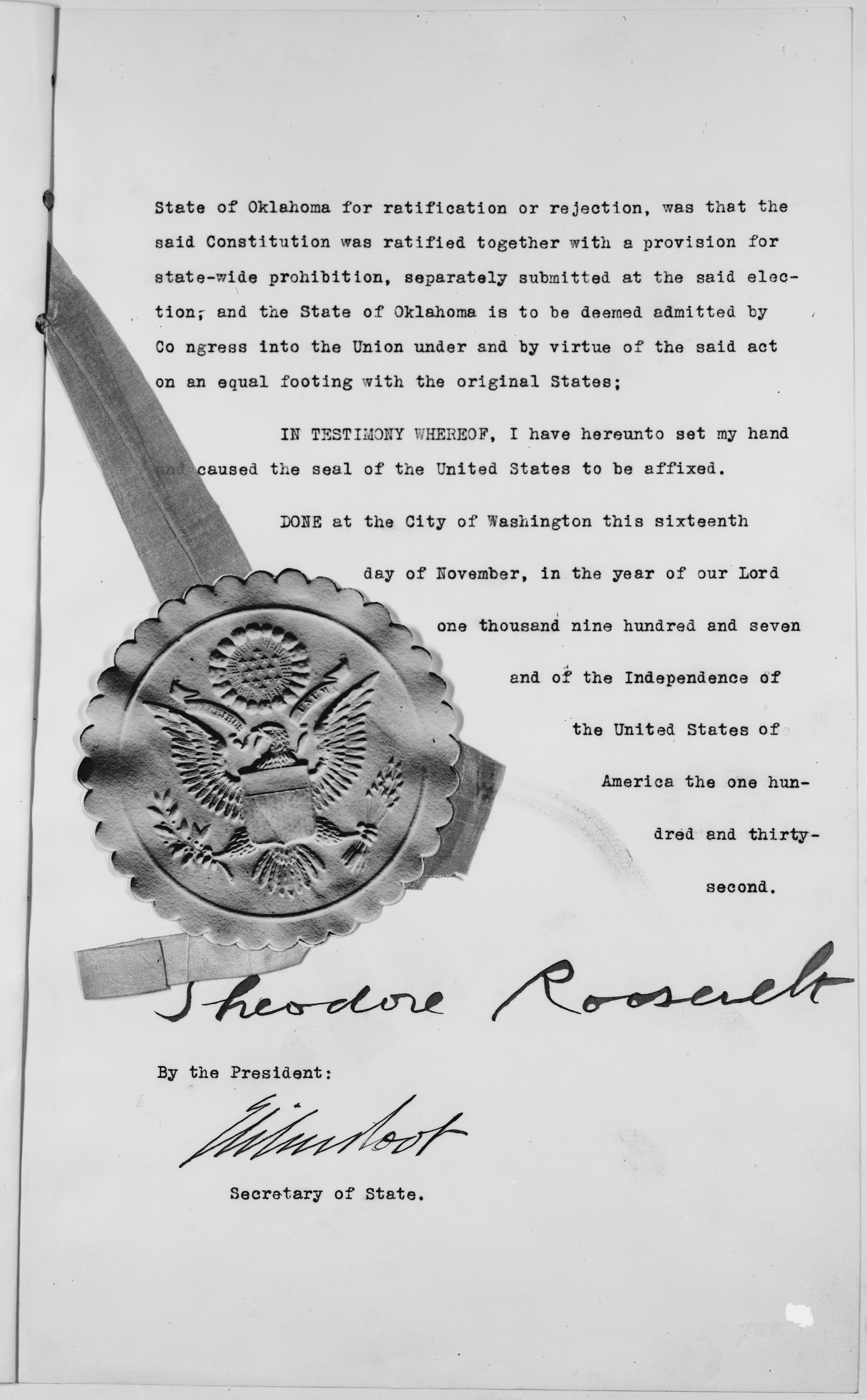
President Theodore Roosevelt's Oklahoma statehood proclamation, November 16, 1907.

The Nighthawks would not acknowledge these forced commitments, and as other Cherokee become citizens of Oklahoma (statehood, November 16, 1907), the traditionalists, believing that "acculturation represented the greatest threat to [their] people," fled to hilly areas near Blackgum Mountain (in present-day Sequoyah County, Oklahoma). There, on the strength of their commitment and numbers—and using the record of Cherokee and Keetoowah history of a sacred wampum belt that they had located—the remaining Nighthawks "strove to preserve the ancient Cherokee culture;" in 1908 they elected Smith as chief for life. But, as Michael Lee Weber notes, "his movement had already declined," and by the end of 1918, "Redbird Smith, 'the moving spirit'" of their society, had died.

Hence, the Keetoowah Nighthawk Society became, alongside the original Keetoowah Society, a spiritual core of the Cherokee people during the years of the early 1900s, in the Indian Territory that would eventually become a part of Oklahoma.

== Etymology ==
The word "Keetoowah" is the name of the ancient Cherokee township of Kituwa in the Eastern Homeland of the Cherokee, where all Cherokee originated after the migration and integration of various groups from the Great Lakes and Ozark Plateau Regions of the United States 3,000 years ago, based upon cultural and archaeological evidence. There is also evidence in the modern culture to suggest that the ancient Keetoowah developed an ancient hereditary priesthood called the Ani-kutani, who were a religious ruling class of the Keetoowah people and Cherokee Society for thousands of years.

According to Cherokee legend, when the population grew too large to sustain the Mother city, groups moved to new areas and created new Cherokee Communities and Mound Cities. The residents of the city of Keetoowah called themselves "the Keetoowah People". The ancient site of the Mother City of Keetoowah is still visible in Western North Carolina in the same general area as the Qualla Boundary. Keetoowah was an ancient "Mound" city and the central earthwork mound is still visible at the ancient townsite. Moundbuilding was not confined to the Cherokee, but was a common construction method of various Mississippian cultures and earlier peoples for thousands of years throughout the Mississippi Basin.

Some Cherokee traditionalists refer to themselves as Ah-ni-ki-tu-wa-gi (spelled variously in local Oklahoma dialects as Ki-tu-wa or Gi-du-wa), Keetoowah People. The addition of the verb stem modifier "gi" indicates the word Ki-tu'-wa-gi means, "a gathering or putting together of the Ki-tu'-wa people", since "gi" means "to combine" in the Cherokee Language. Most modern Cherokee speakers can no longer translate the word "Ki-tu-wa," as the meaning of the word has been lost. Ki-tu-wa means "the mother city" or "the center (spiritual center)" in the ancient Ah-ni-ku-ta-ni dialect. The word Ki-tu'-wa-gi, implies a religious or social gathering of the people. Honoring the mother city was analogous to honoring Selu, the Cherokee Corn Mother of the ancient Green Corn Ceremony, a concept that pervades Cherokee culture.

During the Green Corn Ceremony as practiced by the Cherokee, one of the two social dances performed is of ancient origin, and originated from the mother city of Keetoowah. The dance is called ye-lu-le which means "to the center". During this dance, all of the dancers shout ye-lu-le and move towards the fire in the center of the sacred dance circle . The dance symbolizes the dispersal of the sacred fire given to the Keetoowah people by the Creator and the Thunder Beings in their ancient legends. During traditional Green Corn ceremonies, the Cherokee carried the coals of the central fire in Keetoowah to all the Cherokee communities; the coals were used to kindle the ceremonial fires for the dances in each Cherokee City or township. The home fires in outlying Cherokee communities were extinguished before the ceremonies and re-lit from the coals of the fire kindled during the Green Corn dances.

== History ==
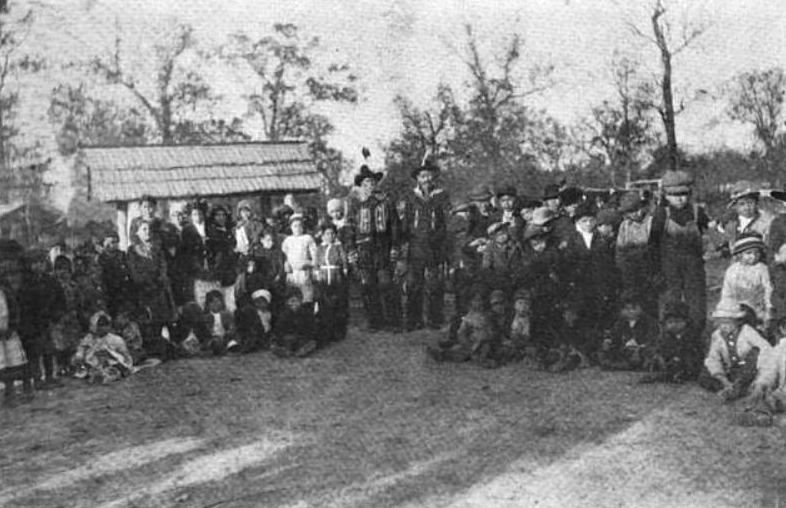
Keetoowah Nighthawk Society leaders Redbird Smith and Bluford Sixkiller instructing children in Cherokee rituals, from Starr (1921).

The Cherokee Nation was divided by the Dawes Commission in the 1890s. The Dawes commission was tasked to force assimilation and breakup of tribal governments within Oklahoma by instilling the concept of land ownership among individual households of the Five Civilized Tribes. The commission divided large sections of land into household allotments to eliminate the traditional governments of the Cherokee and other tribes, which were based on communal holding of land. As a consequence of the Dawes Commission programs, the Cherokee culture and society was destabilized and strictly controlled. The federal government appointed chiefs of the tribe, who were reduced to administrators and carried out government programs intended to force assimilation of the Cherokee.

As part of assimilation, during the late 19th and early 20th centuries, the government sponsored Indian boarding schools, where Cherokee and other Native American children attended away from their families. They were prohibited from speaking their own languages or practicing their own religions and cultures. Over time, much of the Cherokee culture was lost. The remaining Cherokee during this period in history begin to adopt and integrate cultural practices of other tribes who were being forcibly removed into Oklahoma Territory.

=== Redbird Smith ===
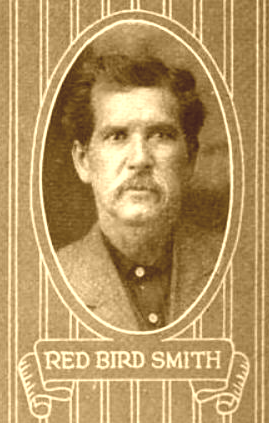
Photograph of Redbird Smith, from Starr (1921).

To resist the cultural erosion, Redbird Smith and other Cherokee leaders and elders formed a secret society, the Keetoowah Nighthawk Society, where they secretly practiced the traditional ceremonies and gatherings. This group aimed to preserve much of the pre-removal culture, ceremonies, and beliefs of the Cherokee.

Redbird Smith was an influential Nighthawk member who revitalized traditional spirituality among Cherokees, beginning in the late 19th century. He was born July 19, 1850, near the city of Fort Smith, Arkansas to parents traveling with other Cherokee to the Indian Territory from Georgia. His father, Pig Redbird Smith, was a devoted supporter of the Long House's group of eastern Indians' ancient rituals, customs and practices. His mother, Lizzie Hildebrand Smith, was from a prominent Cherokee family. During Redbird's childhood, his father committed him to the service of the Cherokee people in harmony with the ancient customs, and eventually he became chairman of the council.

In 1889 the Redbird Movement began, splitting from Keetoowah to create Keetoowah Nighthawk, a renewed and modernized Keetoowah Society that was more political, holding meetings at the ceremonial areas known as gatiyo (stomp grounds). Descendants of the late chief John Ross reintroduced Cherokee wampum belts to the Keetoowah. Although the Keetoowah Nighthawks were unsuccessful in forestalling the allotment of communal lands, they strongly opposed the program of allotment of the Cherokee tribal lands that the government had agreed to do, with much passion.

In 1908, the Keetoowah Nighthawk Council held an election. As a result, Redbird Smith was chosen as chief and was known as the leader of the Keetoowah Nighthawk Society. Redbird Smith, great-grandfather of former Cherokee Nation Principal Chief Chadwick "Corntassel" Smith, stated in the early 1900s:

I have always believed that the Great Creator had a great design for my people, the Cherokees. I have been taught that from my childhood up and now in my mature manhood I recognize it as a great truth. Our forces have been dissipated by the external forces, perhaps it has been just a training, but we must now get together as a race and render our contribution to mankind.

We are endowed with intelligence, we are industrious, we are loyal, and we are spiritual but we are overlooking the Cherokee mission on earth, for no man nor race is endowed with these qualifications without a designed purpose. Work and right training is the solution of my following. We as a group are still groping in darkness in many things, but this we know, we must work. A kindly man cannot help his neighbor in need unless he have a surplus and he cannot have a surplus unless he works. It is so simple and yet we have to continually remind our people of this.

Our Mixed-bloods should not be overlooked in this program of a racial awakening. Our pride in our ancestral heritage is our great incentive for handing something worth while to our posterity. It is this pride in ancestry that makes men strong and loyal for their principle in life. It is this same pride that makes men give up their all for their Government.

His goal was to retain all that was lost from the Keetoowah. He was eventually jailed, along with some followers, for resistance to the land allotment and registration of tribal members. Smith died in 1918, along with the Redbird Movement.

== In modern times ==
The Keetoowah Nighthawk Society has been revived by the Cherokee in Oklahoma. In Redbird Smith's time, there were more than 20 Cherokee Stomp Grounds; the seven ceremonial dance grounds in Oklahoma today belong either to the Keetoowah tradition or the Four Mothers Society.

The society is fractured and is not affiliated with any particular Cherokee Nation, Band, or Tribe. Members of the fragments of the original society are affiliated with many Cherokee communities in Oklahoma. Some of the modern groups claiming to represent the original Keetoowah culture have integrated Christianity and various new age beliefs into their religious practices.

== In popular culture and media ==
The KJRH-TV documentary, Spirit of the Fire (1984) documented the history of the Keetoowah Nighthawk Society, recounting their preservation of traditional ceremonies and rituals practiced and by the early Oklahoma Cherokee people.

== See also ==
- Cherokee
- Cherokee Nation
- Cherokee removal
- Original Keetoowah Society
- Redbird Smith
- Trail of Tears
- The Trail of Tears: Cherokee Legacy (film, 2006)
- United Keetoowah Band of Cherokee Indians
