= Archibald McKennon =

Member of the Arkansas House of Representatives from the Johnson County district
- In office 1877–1878

Personal details
- Born: Tennessee, United States
- Died: September 20, 1920 McAlester, Oklahoma, United States

Archibald Smith McKennon (died September 20, 1920) was an American politician who served in the Arkansas Legislature in 1877.

== Biography ==
Archibald Smith McKennon was born in Tennessee and moved to Arkansas as a child. At 19, he joined the Confederate States Army during the American Civil War. He fought at the Siege of Port Hudson. In 1864, he was elected sheriff of Carroll County, Arkansas. In 1877, he was elected to the Arkansas Legislature representing Johnson County. In 1878, he was elected the prosecuting attorney for the 5th judicial district of Arkansas. In 1893, President Grover Cleveland appointed McKennon to the Dawes Commission. He died on September 20, 1920, in McAlester, Oklahoma.
