= Crazy Snake Rebellion =

1909 Muscogee civil insurrection in Oklahoma

- Part of the American Indian Wars
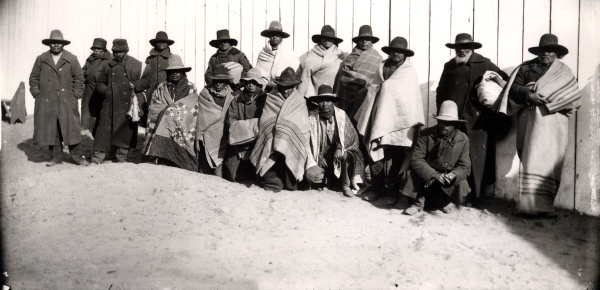
- Crazy Snake rebels in 1909
Date	March 1909
Location	Oklahoma
Result	United States victory

Belligerents
United States	Muscogee rebels, African Americans including Muscogee Freedmen

Commanders and leaders
(United States) Charles N. Haskell	Chitto Harjo (DOW)

Casualties and losses
2 killed	1 killed 1 wounded 42 captured

The Crazy Snake Rebellion, also known as the Smoked Meat Rebellion or Crazy Snake's War, was an incident in 1909 that at times was viewed as a war between the Muscogee people and American settlers. It should not be confused with an earlier, bloodless, conflict in 1901 involving many of the same people. The conflict consisted of only two minor skirmishes, the first of which was actually a struggle between a group of marginalized African Americans and a posse formed to punish the alleged robbery of a piece of smoked meat.

== Rebellion ==
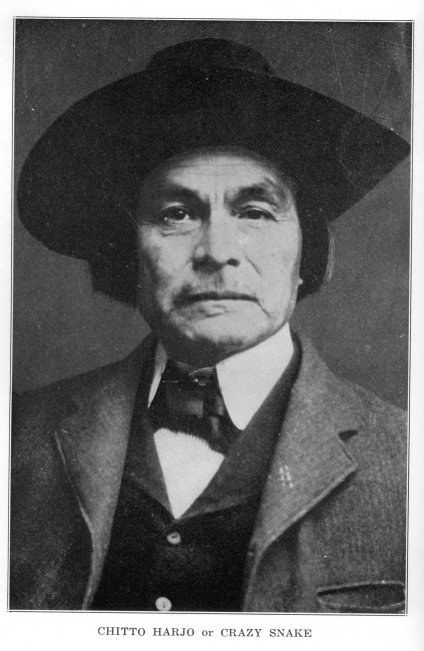
Chitto Harjo, circa 1900

Crazy Snake was the very loose English translation of Chitto Harjo's name. Chitto Harjo was a leader of the Four Mothers Society among the Muscogee and an outspoken opponent of allotment. In 1893 Congress formed the Dawes Commission to seek to have the lands of the Muscogee, Choctaw, Chickasaw and Cherokee allotted. In 1895 Congress authorized surveying of the land, and in 1896 they passed a law creating tribal rolls and breaking up the land. The Muscogee (Creek) Nation's government decided to negotiate the terms the best they could, but in 1898 the Muscogee held an election at which allotment was voted down. In response to this, Congress passed the Curtis Act which dissolved the governments of the Muscogee and their neighboring tribes.

In 1900 there was a meeting where Chitto Harjo was declared the principal chief of the Muscogee by a meeting at his ceremonial grounds near Henryetta, whose people view Pleasant Porter's methods of introducing the allotment system to be in violation of the 1867 Muscogee Constitution. The meeting that elected Harjo also elected a second chief, a bicameral legislature and established a court. Since the Muscogee Nation did not exist in the view of the American government the legality of Harjo's election was not relevant at the time in United States law. The followers of Harjo organized a group called the Lighthorse to serve as a police force to enforce their view of the law. It was alleged that this group whipped some men for accepting allotment, but this is disputed by other writers.

The anti-allotment activities of the Lighthorse caused the 8th Cavalry to be called out and several of the followers of Harjo to be arrested. In 1907 Oklahoma had introduced Jim Crow Laws similar to those of neighboring Arkansas and Texas. As a result of these measures, many African Americans faced restrictions on their residence. A group of African Americans who may have been "Muscogee Freedmen", that is descendants of slaves who had been held by the Muscogee, gathered at Harjo's ceremonial grounds. By July 1908, a large number of African Americans, some of whom were Muscogee Freedmen, had gathered at Old Hickory, the site where Harjo and his associates ran the Muscogee government.

In March 1909 during the annual meeting of the Muscogee traditionalists, there was an allegation that one of them or their African American allies had stolen some meat from a local white farmer. A sheriff's deputy was sent to arrest someone, but the African Americans drove him away both because as auxiliaries to the Muscogee Nation they did not recognize the local county to have authority there and because they had good reason to believe neither an African American nor a Muscogee had chance of a fair trial, but instead had a high likelihood of being lynched. The sheriff's deputy organized a posse to enforce the arrest for the stolen smoked meat. In the following battle, one African-American man was killed and forty-two other African Americans were arrested.

A second confrontation happened on March 27 when a posse from McIntosh County attempted to arrest Chitto Harjo who was holed up in his cabin near Hickory Ground with a few other men. At sundown, the posse was approaching the cabin when one of Harjo's bodyguards opened fire from a window, killing two members of the posse. The fire was returned and a lucky shot hit Harjo in one of his legs above the knee. Eventually, the Muscogee fled under the cover of darkness and the death of the two Americans created a "furor" in Checotah and Henryetta. A larger posse returned to the cabin only to find a woman. The posse fired into the cabin and burned it down, and the woman fled into the woods. After the second skirmish, vigilante groups roamed the vicinity pillaging Snake farms in search of Harjo. Governor Charles N. Haskell called out the state militia. The First Regiment of the Oklahoma National Guard occupied Hickory Ground with 200 men and quickly restored order. Harjo was never captured, though he likely died in April 1911, either in Choctaw territory or in Mexico.
