= Native News Today =

Weekly Native-American hosted television show

Native News Today is a weekly television show produced by the Muscogee (Creek) Nation Communications Department.

It has been hosted by Gerald Wofford a (Cherokee) citizen and Jason Salsman a (Muscogee) citizen. It looks at various events happening throughout Indian Country from an Indian perspective and also endeavors to show some of the good that Native Americans and Indian Tribes are doing throughout their areas. It is in the format of a news program. It airs on KQCW channel 19 in Tulsa, Oklahoma, Saturdays at 1:30 p.m. Until April 6, Native News Today aired on Cox Channel 3 in Tulsa, Saturdays at 11 a.m.

The show is the first of its kind in that it is the only all-Native American show to have its hosts go out to the events they cover bringing back footage and interviews.
