= Ya-ha Hadjo =

Muscogee chief (died 1836)

- Yvhv Haco
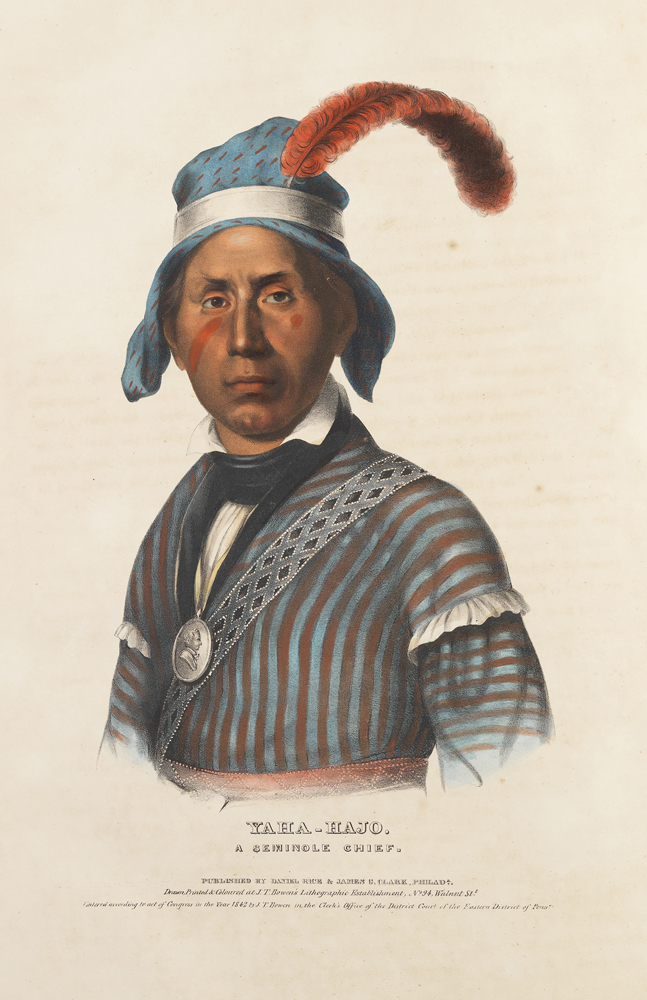
- Portrait of Ya-ha Hadjo in History of the Indian Tribes of North America
- Born: Georgia
- Died: March 29, 1836; Florida
- Other name: Mad Wolf
- Occupation: Creek Nation chief

Ya-ha Hadjo (Creek: Yvhv Haco; transl. Mad Wolf) (died 1836) was a prominent Muscogee chief in Florida before and early in the Second Seminole War.

== Name ==
"Yvhv" is Muscogee for "Wolf". Haco is a Muscogee war title which may be translated as "fearless person" or "so brave as to seem crazy". He was thus sometimes called "Mad Wolf".

== Life ==
Ya-ha avoided forced relocation to Indian Territory with his band by moving south to the Florida Territory where he joined with the Seminole and retained his position as chief. In 1826, while still in Georgia, Mad Wolf visited Washington, D.C. as part of a Creek delegation.

Ya-ha Hadjo was one of the Seminole leaders whose name and mark were placed on the Treaty of Payne's Landing in 1832. He was one of seven Seminole chiefs sent the Indian Territory to inspect the land to which the United States was proposing to move the Seminoles from Florida. In 1834, Ya-ha's name and his mark were placed, along with those of the other six chiefs, on a statement, sometimes called the Treaty of Fort Gibson, that stated that the chiefs agreed for the Seminoles to be moved to the Indian Territory.

Ya-ha Hadjo was reportedly killed on March 29, 1836, in a skirmish at a village near the Oklawaha River. M. Cohen, who served in the Army unit which killed Ya-ha, and who reported that he had personally inspected Ya-ha's body, described him as chief of the "Oklawaha tribe", whom Cohen claimed were descended from the Yamasee. There was another individual named Ya-ha Hadjo who was married to one of Osceola'a sisters. It's possible the reported death in 1836 may have been a case of mistaken identity.

== Sources ==
- Cohen, M. M. (1836). Notices of Florida and the Campaigns. Charleson, South Carolina: Burges & Honour – via Google Books.
- Wickman, Patricia R. (2006). Osceola's Legacy. Tuscaloosa, Alabama: The University of Alabama Press. ISBN 978-0-8173-5332-2 – via Google Books.
