= Harjo, Oklahoma =

Harjo
- Unincorporated community
- Location within the state of Oklahoma Harjo (the United States)
- Coordinates: 35°12′46″N 96°49′33″W
- Country: United States
- State: Oklahoma
- County: Pottawatomie
- Time zone: UTC-6 (Central (CST))
  - Summer (DST): UTC-5 (CDT)

Harjo is an unincorporated community in Pottawatomie County, Oklahoma, United States. The word Harjo (Haco) means "brave beyond discretion" in the Muscogee language.

The post office was established on June 24, 1921, and discontinued on August 31, 1954.

Nearby is the Rose-Fast site (34PT28), a precontact Indian base camp dating from the Woodland period (circa 1 to 1000). The site was added to the NRHP in 1986.
