= William Harjo LoneFight =

American writer

William Harjo LoneFight (born 1966), is president and CEO of American Native Services, a consulting firm in Bismarck, North Dakota.

An alumnus of Dartmouth College, Oklahoma City University, and Stanford University, LoneFight has served on the board of directors of the American Indian College Fund, American Indian Higher Education Consortium, and The Jacobson Foundation. An enrolled citizen of the Muscogee (Creek) Nation of Oklahoma with Natchez ancestry, Harjo was raised in a traditional Muscogee (Creek) Indian community. LoneFight wrote a book, Achieving the Healing Community: A Guide to Traditional Knowledge of Substance Abuse Prevention (1999), to help social workers develop new approaches to substance abuse prevention. He is an accomplished creative writer and was anthologized in the milestone anthology, "Returning the Gift," a collection of Native American poets. He also developed a culturally-based pedagogical theory which seeks to reform approaches in the disciplines of math, science, and technology to utilize the diverse cultural backgrounds of such students in order to enhance their learning.

== Selected boards and service ==
- American Indian Higher Education Consortium, board of directors, 2002–2006. Chair, Federal Relations Committee 2003–2006
- North Dakota Association of Tribal Colleges, board of directors, 2002–2005
- Sisseton Wahpeton College. President, 2003
- American Indian College Fund, board of directors, 2004–2006
- Sisseton, South Dakota Chamber of Commerce 2003-2005
- Coalition for the Advancement of Mathematics and Science Education in Oklahoma (CASMEO) Board of directors and executive committee
- Oklahoma State Interagency Task Force on the Prevention of Child Abuse 1994
- Dartmouth College Alumni Council, 1999
- Jacobson Foundation, Norman, OK, board of directors

== Name ==
"Lone Fight" is a broad family name related exclusively to the Mandan, Hidatsa and Arikara Nation of the Fort Berthold Reservation in North Dakota. The original spelling of "Lone Fight" consists of two words, but the spelling "LoneFight" is becoming more common. "Harjo" is a Muscogee surname.
