= Redbird Smith =

Cherokee traditionalist and activist (1850–1918)

- To-Juwah Sequanitah
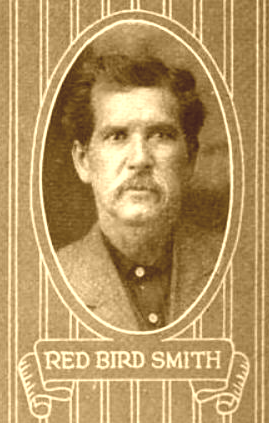

Chief of the Nighthawk Keetoowahs; Tribal councilor from the Illinois District of the Cherokee Nation, 1887, 1889 leader
- Succeeded by: Levi Gritts

Personal details
- Born: July 19, 1850 Near Fort Smith, Arkansas
- Died: November 8, 1918 (aged 68)
- Resting place: Redbird Smith Cemetery, Sequoyah County, Oklahoma
- Spouse: Lucy Fields Smith
- Relations: Great-grandson, Chad "Corntassel" Smith
- Children: Sam Smith; eight sons, two daughters
- Parent(s): Pig Redbird Smith, Lizzie Hildebrand Smith
- Known for: Cherokee traditionalist and political activist, who helped found the Nighthawk Keetoowah Society and revitalized traditional spirituality; opposed the Dawes Allotment Act

Redbird Smith (born To-Juwah Sequanitah, Cherokee) (1850–1918) was a traditionalist and political activist in the Cherokee Nation in Indian Territory. He helped found the Nighthawk Keetoowah Society, whose members revitalized traditional spirituality among the Cherokee from the mid-19th century to the early 20th century.

== Early life ==
Redbird Smith was born into a Cherokee family on July 19, 1850, in Indian Territory, near the current city of Fort Smith, Arkansas. His father was Pig Redbird Smith, who was given his surname by European Americans, after they noted that he worked as a blacksmith. Redbird Smith's mother was Lizzie (Hildebrand) Smith. His parents had been removed from Georgia to Indian Territory. Both his parents were ardent traditionalists. When Redbird Smith was ten, his "father dedicated him to the services and cause of the Cherokee people in accordance with ancient customs and usages."

== Political activism ==
In the late 19th century the Dawes Commission was established under the Dawes Act. It was ordered to carry out registration of members of Indian tribes, in order to identify heads of households for the allotments of communal lands to individual families. This was to be a means to convert Native Americans to the European-American model of subsistence farming. Any lands remaining after such allotment were to be declared "surplus", and the United States government would put them up for sale, including to non-natives. Redbird Smith led a political resistance movement to the Dawes Allotment Act and sought to return to traditional Cherokee religious nationalism and values.

In 1887 and 1889, Smith served as a tribal councilor from the Illinois District of the Cherokee Nation.

Smith said in the early 1900s:

"I have always believed that the Great Creator had a great design for my people, the Cherokees. I have been taught that from my childhood up and now in my mature manhood I recognize it as a great truth. Our forces have been dissipated by the external forces, perhaps it has been just a training, but we must now get together as a race and render our contribution to mankind. We are endowed with intelligence, we are industrious, we are loyal and we are spiritual but we are overlooking the Cherokee mission on earth, for no man nor race is endowed with these qualifications without a designed purpose... Our pride in our ancestral heritage is our great incentive for handing something worthwhile to our posterity. It is this pride in ancestry that makes men strong and loyal for their principal in life. It is this same pride that makes men give up their all for their Government.

Smith repatriated wampum belts belonging to his tribe. In 1910 he was selected as chief of the Nighthawk Keetoowahs. Previously he had served as their chairman. Also in 1910, Smith and fellow Nighthawks traveled to Mexico with an 1820 document supporting Cherokee lands claims from when bands had lived there, but the Mexican government did not support their claims. In 1914, he petitioned President Woodrow Wilson to create a Keetoowah reservation, but the US government rejected the idea, believing that reservations hindered its assimilation policy for Native Americans. In 1921, one hundred Cherokee from 35 families moved together to the southeastern corner of Cherokee County, Oklahoma, to create a traditional community. This was "the brainchild of Redbird Smith."

== Family ==
Redbird Smith married Lucy Fields, born in Braggs, Indian Territory in 1852. She was the daughter of Richard Fields and Eliza (née Brewer) Fields. Together the Smiths had ten children who survived into adulthood, including eight sons and two daughters.

Among their descendants is great-grandson Chad Smith, former Principal Chief of the Cherokee Nation.

== Death and legacy ==
After falling ill for 48 hours, Redbird Smith died on November 8, 1918. He is buried in the Redbird Smith Cemetery in Sequoyah County, Oklahoma.

He served as chief of the Nighthawk Keetoowahs until his death and was succeeded for a short period by Levi Gritts. His son Sam Smith became chief of the Nighthawk Keetowahs on April 7, 1919.

The Redbirth Smith ground is an active ceremonial ground. Redbird Smith, Oklahoma, Sequoyah County, was named for him. Smith's birthday on July 19 is celebrated annually at the ceremonial ground.

== See also ==
- Original Keetoowah Society
- Stomp dance
