= Timothy Long =

Timothy Long (born December 19, 1967) is an American conductor and pianist with an active performing career in the United States and abroad. He is a member of the Thlopthlocco Tribal Town of the Muscogee Creek Nation of Oklahoma.

He was born in Holdenville, Oklahoma, United States. Long is a member of the faculty at the Stony Brook University He is music director of Stony Brook Opera, and assistant to the music director of Opera Theatre of Saint Louis.

Long is founding conductor of The Coast Orchestra, an all-Native American orchestra of classically trained musicians. He has conducted the ensemble in performances at the Smithsonian Institution’s National Museum of the American Indian, the American Museum of Natural History, and Rutgers University. The group performs music including the original score for a newly restored print of Edward S. Curtis’ 1914 film In the Land of the Head Hunters.

For three years, Long served as assistant conductor to Robert Spano at the Brooklyn Philharmonic. He was an associate conductor at New York City Opera for two years.

In 2008, Bridge Records released Long’s first recording as conductor and pianist, The Music Teacher, a play/opera by Wallace and Allen Shawn.

Long studied piano and violin at Oklahoma City University while playing in the violin section of the Oklahoma City Philharmonic. He completed his graduate work in piano performance and literature at the Eastman School of Music. He will now be returning to Eastman where he will serve as the Opera Music Director.
