= Green Corn Ceremony =

Native American custom

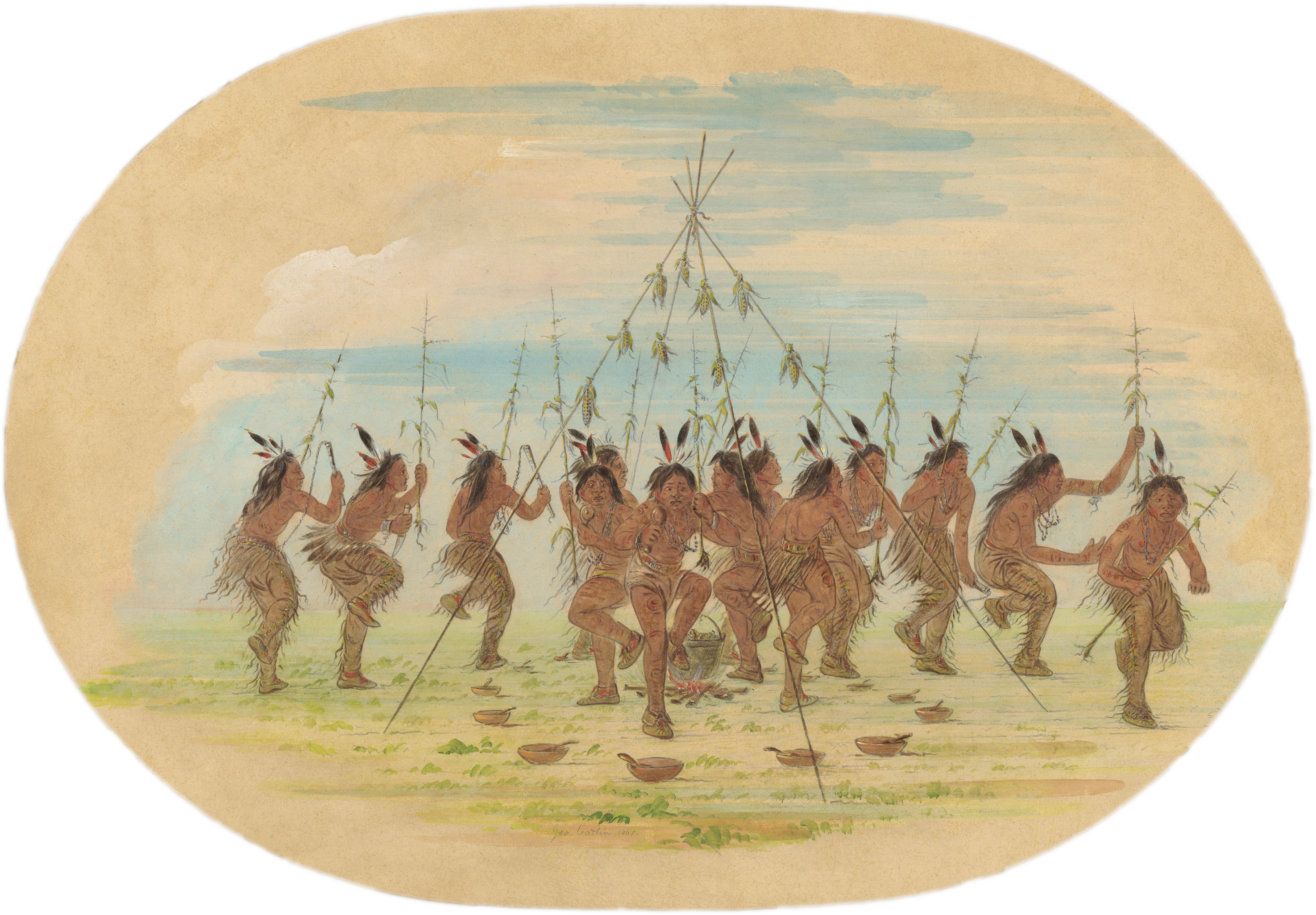
George Catlin's painting, Green Corn Dance - Minatarrees, 1861

The Green Corn Ceremony (Busk) is an annual ceremony practiced among various Native American peoples associated with the beginning of the yearly corn harvest. Busk is a term given to the ceremony by white traders, the word being a corruption of the Creek word puskita (pusketv) for "a fast". These ceremonies have been documented ethnographically throughout the North American Eastern Woodlands and Southeastern tribes. Historically, it involved a first fruits rite in which the community would sacrifice the first of the green corn to ensure the rest of the crop would be successful. These Green Corn festivals were practiced widely throughout southern North America by many tribes evidenced in the Mississippian people and throughout the Mississippian Ideological Interaction Sphere. Green Corn festivals are still held today by many different Southeastern Woodland tribes. The Green Corn Ceremony typically occurs in late June or July, determined locally by the developing of the corn crops. The ceremony is marked with dancing, feasting, fasting and religious observations.

== Traditions ==
The Green Corn Ceremony is a celebration of many types, representing new beginnings. Also referred to as the Great Peace Ceremony, it is a celebration of thanksgiving to Hesaketvmese (The Breath Maker) for the first fruits of the harvest, and a New Year festival as well.

The Busk is the celebration of the New Year. In modern tribal towns and Stomp Dance societies only the ceremonial fire, the cook fires and certain other ceremonial objects will be replaced. Everyone usually begins gathering by the weekend prior to the ceremony, working, praying, dancing and fasting off and on until the big day.

The whole festival tends to last seven-eight days, including the historical preparation involved (without the preparation, it lasts about four days).

== Day one ==
The first day of the ceremony, people set up their campsites on one of the square ceremonial grounds. Following this, there is a feast of the remains of last year's crop, after which all the men of the community begin fasting (historically, the women were limited in their participation of this part of the ceremony). That night there is a social stomp dance, unique to the Muscogee and Southeastern cultures.

== Day two ==
Before dawn on the second day, four brush-covered arbors are set up on the edges of the ceremonial grounds, one in each of the sacred directions. For the first dance of the day, the women of the community participate in a Ribbon or Ladies Dance, which involves fastening rattles and shells to their legs perform a purifying dance with special ribbon-clad sticks to prepare the ceremonial ground for the renewal ceremony. The ceremonial fire is set in the middle of four logs laid crosswise, so as to point to the four directions. The Mico "Mekko" (Chief of Ceremonial Grounds or Tribal Town ) takes out a little of each of the new crops (not just corn, but beans, squash, wild plants, and others) rubbed with bear oil, and it is offered together with some meat as "first-fruits" and an atonement for all sins. The fire (which has been re-lit and nurtured with a special medicine by the medicine man or "Heleshayv" hilis-hi-ya ) will be kept alive until the following year's Green Corn Ceremony. In traditional times, the women would sweep out their cook-fires and the rest of their homes and collect the filth from this, as well as any old clothing and furniture to be burnt and replaced with new items for the new year. The women then bring the coals of the fire into their homes, to rekindle their home fires. They can then bake the new fruits of the year over this fire (also to be eaten with bear oil). Many Creeks also practice the sapi or ceremonial scratches, a type of bloodletting in the mid morning, and in many tribes the men and women might rub corn milk, ash, white clay, or analogous mixtures over themselves and bathe as a form of purification.

Traditionally, they drink a medicine referred to as assi, also referred to as the "White Drink." (English traders referred to it as the "Black Drink" due to its dark liquid which froths white when shaken before drinking). This White Drink, known to strangers as Carolina Tea, is a caffeine-laden mixture of seven to fourteen different herbs, the main ingredient being assi-luputski, Creek for "small leaves" of Yaupon Holly. This medicine was intended to help receive purification, as it is a purgative when consumed in mass amounts. (Historically, only men drank enough of the liquid to throw up.) The purgative was consumed to clean the dietary tract of last year's crop and to truly renew oneself for the new year.

== Day three ==
While the second day tends to focus on the women's dance, the third is focused on the men's.

After the purification of the second day, men of the community perform the Feather Dance to heal the community.

The fasting usually ends by supper-time after the word is given by the women that the food is prepared, at which time the men march in single-file formation down to a body of water, typically a flowing creek or river for a ceremonial dip in the water and private men's meeting. They then return to the ceremonial square and perform a single Stomp Dance before retiring to their home camps for a feast. During this time, the participants in the medicine rites are not allowed to sleep, as part of their fast. At midnight a Stomp Dance ceremony is held, which includes feasting and continues on through the night.

== Day four ==
The fourth day has friendship dances at dawn, games, and people later pack up and return home with their feelings of purification and forgiveness. Fasting from alcohol, sexual activity, and open water will continue for another four days.

== Symbolism ==
Puskita, commonly referred to as the "Green Corn Ceremony" or "Busk," is the central and most festive holiday of the traditional Muscogee people. It represents not only the renewal of the annual cycle, but of the spirit and traditions of the Muscogee. This is representative of the return of summer, the ripening of the new corn, and the common Native American traditions of environmental and agricultural renewal.

Historically in the Seminole tribe, 12-year-old boys are declared men at the Green Corn Ceremony, and given new names by the chief as a mark of their maturity.

== Tribal participation ==
Several tribes still participate in these ceremonies each year, but tribes who have historic tradition within the ceremony include the Yuchi, Haudenosaunee, Cherokee, Creek, Choctaw, Natchez, Chickasaw, Shawnee, Miccosukee, Alabama, Hitchiti, Coushatta, Taskigi and Seminole tribes. Each of those tribes may have its own variations of celebration, dances and traditions but performs a new year's ceremony, involving fasting and several other comparisons each year.

== See also ==
- Rainmaking (ritual)
