= Dawes Commission =

1893 US federal commission and envoy to Native American tribal leadership

The American Dawes Commission, named for its first chairman Henry L. Dawes, was authorized under a rider to an Indian Office appropriation bill, March 3, 1893. Its purpose was to convince the Five Civilized Tribes to agree to cede tribal title of Indian lands, and adopt the policy of dividing tribal lands into individual allotments that was enacted for other tribes as the Dawes Act of 1887. In November 1893, President Grover Cleveland appointed Dawes as chairman, and Meridith H. Kidd and Archibald McKennon as members.

During this process, the Indian nations were stripped of their communally held national lands, which was divided into single lots and allotted to individual members of the nation. The Dawes Commission required that individuals claim membership in only one tribe, although many people had more than one line of ancestry. Registration in the national registry known as the Dawes Rolls has come to be critical in issues of Indian citizenship and land claims.

Although many Indian tribes did not consider strict 'blood' descent the only way to determine if a person was a member of a tribe, the Dawes Commission did. Many Freedmen (slaves of Indians who were freed after the Civil War), were kept off the rolls as members of tribes, although they were emancipated after the war and, according to peace treaties with the United States, to be given full membership in the appropriate tribes in which they were held. Even if freedmen were of mixed-race ancestry, as many were, the Dawes Commission enrolled them in separate Freedmen Rolls, rather than letting them self-identify as to membership. The same was true for members of the historical African descendant communities which developed alongside different Indian settlements in Florida (a Spanish colony for most of the colonial period until 1821 and a popular destination for both escaped slaves and indigenous Southeastern Woodlands refugees) prior to deportation, such as the Black Seminoles, who then accompanied them to Indian Territory.

Under Article 14 of the Treaty of Dancing Rabbit Creek (1831), members of the Mississippi Choctaw had the option of not being relocated to Indian Territory. They were required to register and remain on allocated land in Mississippi or Alabama. The registration process was handled poorly and when blood descendants later emigrated to Indian Territory they had to appeal to the Dawes Commission for recognition as tribal members. The Commission denied power to amend the membership roles.

Many Muscogee Freedmen are still seeking equal citizenship rights within the Muscogee Nation. The tribe has defined as citizens only those who are descended by blood from a Muscogee listed on the Dawes Rolls. A similar controversy has occurred within the Cherokee Nation regarding the Cherokee Freedmen. The Cherokee Nation voted in a referendum (from which the Freedmen were excluded) to exclude all Freedmen except those who could prove descent by blood from a Cherokee on the Dawes Rolls.

The result of the Dawes Commission was that the five Indian nations lost most of their national land bases, as the government declared as "surplus" any remaining after the allotment to individual households. The US sold the surplus land, formerly Indian territory, to European-American settlers. In addition, over the next decades, settlers bought land from individual Indian households, thus reducing overall land held by tribal members. The Indians received money from the overall sale of lands, but lost most of their former territory. As tribes began to re-establish self-government after 1934, and especially since the 1970s, they have tried to end the sales of tribal lands.

Angie Debo's landmark work, And Still the Waters Run: The Betrayal of the Five Civilized Tribes (1940), detailed how the allotment policy of the Dawes Commission and the Curtis Act of 1898 was systematically manipulated to deprive the Native Americans of their lands and resources. In the words of historian Ellen Fitzpatrick, Debo's book "advanced a crushing analysis of the corruption, moral depravity, and criminal activity that underlay white administration and execution of the allotment policy."

== See also ==
- Native American tribal rolls
