= Cherokee history =

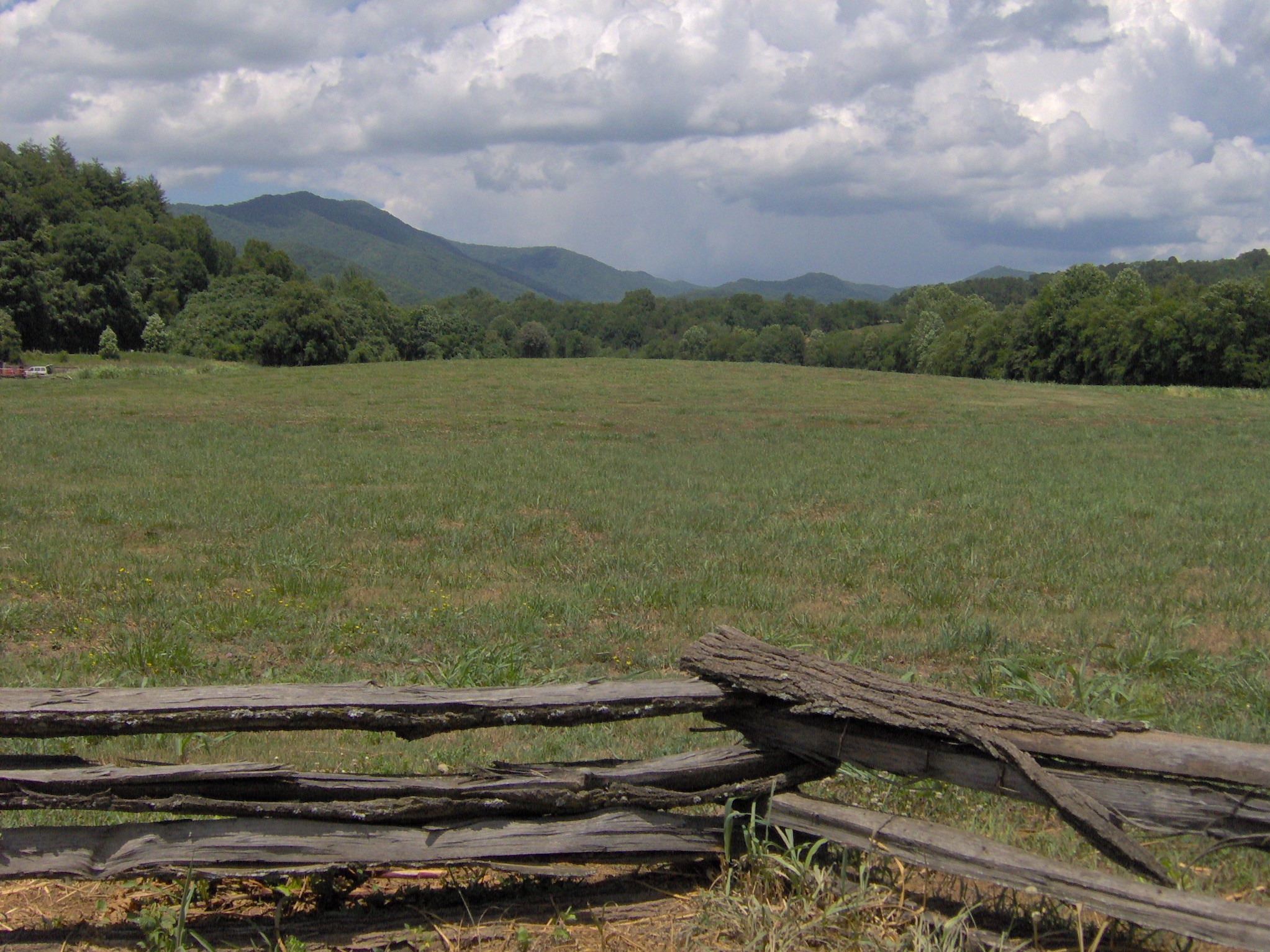
Kituwa Mound, location of the Cherokee mother town in North Carolina

Cherokee history is the written and oral lore, traditions, and historical record maintained by the living Cherokee people and their ancestors. In the 21st century, leaders of the Cherokee people define themselves as those persons enrolled in one of the three federally recognized Cherokee tribes: The Eastern Band of Cherokee Indians, The Cherokee Nation, and The United Keetoowah Band of Cherokee Indians.

The first live predominantly in North Carolina, the traditional heartland of the people; the latter two tribes are based in what is now Oklahoma, and was Indian Territory when their ancestors were forcibly relocated there from the Southeast. The Cherokee people have extensive written records, including detailed genealogical records, preserved in the Cherokee language which is written with the Cherokee syllabary, and also in the English language.

== Origins ==
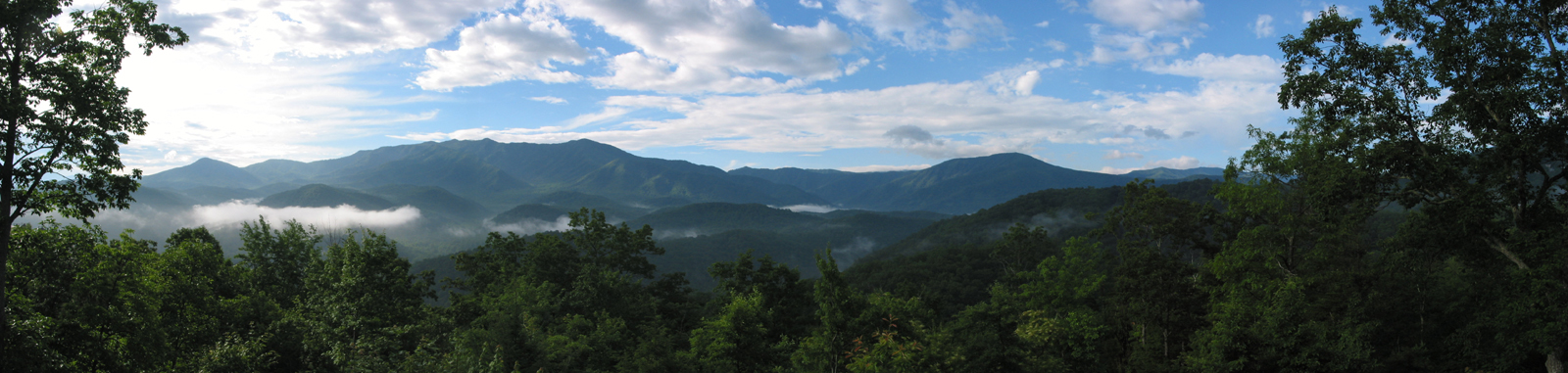
Great Smoky Mountains

The Cherokee are members of the Iroquoian language-family of North American indigenous peoples, and are believed to have migrated in ancient times from the Great Lakes area, where most of such language families were located. The migration is recounted in their oral history. They established a homeland in the Southeastern Woodlands, an area that includes present-day western Virginia, southeastern Tennessee, western North and South Carolina, and northeastern Georgia. In the late eighteenth century, the Cherokee moved further south and west, deeper into Georgia and Alabama.

The Mississippian culture was a civilization that influenced peoples throughout the Ohio and Mississippi valleys and into the Southeast. It was marked by dense town sites and extensive construction of platform mounds and other earthworks, used for religious and political purposes, and sometimes elite residences or burials.

In the Cherokee homeland of what is now western North Carolina, prehistoric platform mounds have been identified archeologically as built during the periods of the Woodland and South Appalachian Mississippian cultures, by peoples who were ancestral to the historic Cherokee. The Mississippian culture was influential here beginning about 1000 CE, later than further north. Also, rather than large settlements featuring multiple mounds, in this homeland, most settlements with mounds featured one. They were often surrounded by smaller villages.

According to Benjamin A. Steere and the Western North Carolina Mounds and Towns Project, in association with the Eastern Band of Cherokee and University of Georgia, as the historic Cherokee developed in this area, they began to create a different kind of public architecture, one that emphasized large townhouses standing on top of the mounds. During the next centuries, the Cherokee would add to or replace the townhouses and also maintain and enlarge the mounds in the process.

Cherokee culture shows association with Pisgah phase archeological sites, which were part of the Southern Appalachian Mississippian culture in this region. Artifacts from historic Cherokee towns also featured iconography from the Southeastern Ceremonial Complex. This is believed likely to have been due to Cherokee assimilation of regional survivors during the expansion of this people.

Corn is traditionally central to the religious ceremonies of the Cherokee, especially the Green Corn Ceremony. This tradition was shared with other Iroquois-language tribes, as well as with the Creek, Choctaw, Yuchi, and Seminole of the Southeast.

=== European contact ===
In 1540, at the time of the Hernando de Soto expedition, the Southeastern Woodlands region was inhabited by peoples of several mound-building cultures.

By the 1720s, the powerful Cherokee were well established at the southern end of the Great Appalachian Valley, having displaced the Muscogee Creek and other tribes. Other indigenous peoples also occupied territory and villages in Eastern Tennessee. For instance, the Long Hunter colonial expeditions of the 1760s recorded encountering Yuchi and Siouan-speaking traders and villages.

The Cherokee are believed to have settled more deeply into Georgia and Alabama in the late eighteenth century.

A Cherokee myth recorded in the late 18th century says that a "Moon-eyed people" had lived in the Cherokee regions before they arrived. The group was described in 1797 by Colonel Leonard Marbury to Benjamin Smith Barton. According to Marbury, when the Cherokee arrived in the area, they had encountered a "moon-eyed" people who could not see in the day-time.

== Early culture ==
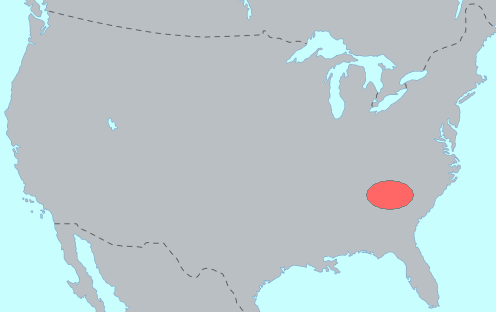
Prior to the 17th century, the Cherokee lived in the western Carolinas, western Virginia, Eastern Tennessee and northeastern Georgia

Much of what is known about pre-19th century Cherokee culture and society comes from the papers of American writer John Howard Payne. The Payne papers describe the oral account by Cherokee elders of a traditional societal structure in which a "white" organization of elders represented the seven clans. According to Payne, this group, which was hereditary and described as priestly, was responsible for religious activities such as healing, purification, and prayer. A second group of younger men, the "red" organization, was responsible for warfare. Because warfare was considered a polluting activity, the priestly class conducted purification ceremonies of participants before they could reintegrate into normal village life. This hierarchy had disappeared long before the 18th century. The reasons for the change have been debated, with the origin of the decline traced to a revolt by the Cherokee against the abuses of the priestly class known as the Ani-kutani. ("Aní-" is a prefix referring to a group of individuals, while the meaning of "kutáni" is unknown).

Early American ethnographer James Mooney, who lived with and studied the Cherokee in the late 1880s, was the first to write about the decline of the former hierarchy in relation to this revolt. By the time Mooney lived with the Cherokee, their development of religious practitioners was more informal. It was based more on individual knowledge and ability than upon heredity.

Another major source of early cultural history comes from materials written in the 19th century by the didanvwisgi (Cherokee:ᏗᏓᏅᏫᏍᎩ), Cherokee medicine men, using the Cherokee syllabary created by Sequoyah in the 1820s. Initially only the didanvwisgi used these materials, which were considered extremely powerful. Later, the writings were widely adopted by the Cherokee people.

Unlike most other Indians in the American southeast at the start of the historic era, the Cherokee spoke an Iroquoian language. Since the Great Lakes region was the core of Iroquoian-language speakers, scholars have theorized that the Cherokee migrated south from that region. However, some argue that the Iroquois all migrated north from the southeast, with the Tuscarora breaking off from that group during the migration and settling in North Carolina. Linguistic analysis shows a relatively large difference between Cherokee and the northern Iroquoian languages, suggesting a split between the peoples in the distant past. Glottochronology studies suggest the split occurred between about 1,500 and 1,800 B.C.

The Cherokee identify their ancient settlement of Kituwa on the Tuckasegee River, formerly next to and now part of Qualla Boundary (the reservation of the Eastern Band of Cherokee Indians), as the original Cherokee settlement in the Southeast.

== 16th century: Spanish contact ==
The first known Cherokee contact with Europeans was in late May 1540, when a Spanish expedition led by Hernando de Soto passed through Cherokee country near present-day Embreeville, Tennessee, which the Spaniards referred to as Guasili. De Soto's expedition visited many of the villages later identified as Cherokee in Georgia and Tennessee. It recorded a Chalaque nation as living around the Keowee River where present-day North Carolina, South Carolina and Georgia meet. New infectious diseases carried by the Spaniards and their animals decimated the Cherokee and other Eastern tribes, who had no immunity.

A second Spanish expedition came through Cherokee country in 1567 led by Juan Pardo. He was seeking an overland route to Mexican silver mines; the Spanish mistakenly thought the Appalachians were connected to a range in Mexico. Spanish troops built six forts in the interior southeast, including at Joara, a Mississippian culture chiefdom. They also visited the Cherokee towns Nikwasi, Estatoe, Tugaloo, Conasauga, and Kituwa, but ultimately failed to gain dominion over the region and retreated to the coast. The Native Americans rebelled against their efforts, killing all but one of the garrison soldiers among the six forts. Pardo had already returned to his base. The Spanish did not try to settle this area again.

== 17th century: English contact ==
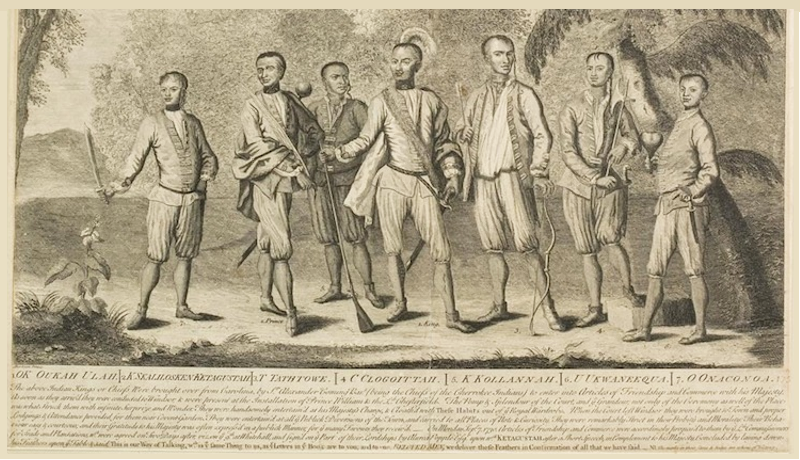
These Cherokee accompanied Sir Alexander Cumming to England in 1730.

Regular encounter with English colonists began to take place in the mid-17th century. In 1650 the Cherokee were estimated to have a population of 22,500 persons, living primarily in independent towns and smaller villages along the river valleys of the South Appalachian Mountains in parts of present-day eastern Tennessee, the western parts of what are now defined as the states of North Carolina and South Carolina, and northeastern Georgia. Their territory had an area of approximately 40,000 square miles (100,000 square km).

The first Anglo-Cherokee contact may have been in 1656, when English settlers in Virginia Colony recorded that six to seven hundred "Mahocks, Nahyssans and Rechahecrians" had encamped at Bloody Run, located on the eastern edge of present-day Richmond, Virginia. A combined force of English and tributary Pamunkey drove them off, but the Pamunkey chief Totopotomoi was slain in the battle. While the first two named groups are considered to be Virginia Siouan, the identity of the Rechahecrians has been much debated. Historians have noted that the name closely resembles that of the Eriechronon, commonly known as the Erie tribe, an Iroquoian people who had been driven away from the southern shore of Lake Erie in 1654 during the Beaver Wars by the powerful Iroquois Five Nations based to the east. Anthropologist Martin Smith theorized that remnants of the Erie migrated to Virginia after the wars. (1986:131–32) Robert J. Conley (Cherokee) and a few other historians have suggested that the Erie were identical to the Cherokee, but this view does not have a consensus. Although believed to have been Iroquoian, the Erie language was too scarcely documented for linguists to fully place its relationship to Cherokee or other Iroquoian languages.

In 1673, fur trader Abraham Wood from Fort Henry (modern Petersburg, Virginia) sent two English traders, James Needham and Gabriel Arthur, to the Overhill Cherokee country on the west side of the Appalachians. Wood hoped to forge a direct trading connection with the Cherokee to bypass the Occaneechi people in Virginia, who acted as middlemen on the Trading Path. The two Virginia colonists likely made contact with the Cherokee. Wood called the people Rickohockens in his book of the expedition. The map accompanying the book, showed the Rickohockens occupying all of present-day southwestern Virginia, southeastern Kentucky, northwestern North Carolina and the northeastern tip of Tennessee. These areas on both sides of the Appalachian Mountains have been considered the homelands of the Cherokee, together with western South Carolina and northeastern Georgia.

Needham departed with a guide nicknamed 'Indian John,' while Arthur stayed in Chota to learn the Cherokee language. On his journey, Needham argued with 'Indian John', who killed him. 'Indian John' tried to encourage his people to kill Arthur, too, but the chief prevented this. Disguised as a Cherokee, Arthur accompanied the Chota chief on raids of Spanish settlements in Florida, Indian communities on the southeast coast, and Shawnee towns on the Ohio River. In 1674 he was captured by the Shawnee, who discovered that he was a white man. The Shawnee allowed him to return to Chota. In June 1674, the Chota chief escorted Arthur back to his English settlement in Virginia.

By the late 17th century, colonial traders from both Virginia and Carolina were making regular journeys to Cherokee lands, but few wrote about their experiences. Historians have studied records of colonial laws and lawsuits involving traders to learn more about these early years. The English and other Europeans were seeking mainly deerskins, raw material for the booming European leather industry, in exchange for which they traded European "trade goods" that featured technology new to the Native Americans, such as iron and steel tools (kettles, knives, etc.), firearms, gunpowder, and ammunition. In 1705, traders complained that they were losing business to the Indian slave trade, instigated and supported by Carolina Governor James Moore of the Province of South Carolina. Moore had commissioned people to "set upon, assault, kill, destroy, and take captive as many Indians as possible". When the captives were sold, slave traders split profits with the Governor. Although colonial governments from an early period prohibited selling alcohol to Indians, traders commonly used rum, and later whiskey, as common items of trade.

During the early historic era, Europeans classified the Cherokee towns by such terms as Lower, Middle, and Overhill to designate them geographically, in relation to the colonists' bases on the Atlantic coast. The Lower Towns were situated along the headwater streams of the Keowee River(known as the Savannah River in its lower reaches), mainly in present-day western South Carolina and northeastern Georgia. Keowee was one of the chief Lower towns, as was Tugaloo.

The Middle Towns were located in present Western North Carolina, on the headwater streams of the Tennessee River, such as the upper Little Tennessee River, upper Hiwassee River, and upper French Broad River. Among several chief towns were Nikwasi. The Out Towns, including the ancient 'mother town' of Kituwa, were along the upper Tuckaseegee River and Oconaluftee River. The Valley Towns were along the Nantahala River and Valley Rivers.

The Overhill Towns were located across the higher mountains in present-day eastern Tennessee and northwestern Georgia, along the Tennessee and Tellico River, one of its tributaries. Principal towns included Chota, Tellico, and Tanasi. The Europeans, primarily English, used these terms to describe their changing geopolitical relationship with the Cherokee.

Two more groups of towns were often listed in these groupings, both in Western North Carolina: the Out Towns, based along the Tuckaseegee and Onconaluftee rivers. The chief town was Kituwa on the Tuckaseegee River, considered by the Cherokee as their 'mother town'. The Valley Towns were along the Nantahala and Valley rivers. Their chief town was Tomotley on the Valley River (this is not the same as Tomotley on the lower Little Tennessee River in what is now Tennessee). The former shared the dialect of the Middle Towns and the latter that of the Overhill people (later known as Upper) Towns.

Of the southeastern Indian confederacies of the late 17th and early 18th centuries (Creek (Muscogee), Chickasaw, Choctaw, etc.), the Cherokee were one of the most populous and powerful. They were relatively isolated by their hilly and mountainous homeland. Virginia colonists started trading with them in the late 17th century. In the 1690s, the Cherokee founded a much stronger and more important trade relationship with the colony of South Carolina, which was based in the port of Charles Town on the Atlantic coast. By the 18th century, South Carolina overshadowed Virginia trading with the Cherokee.

== 18th-century history ==
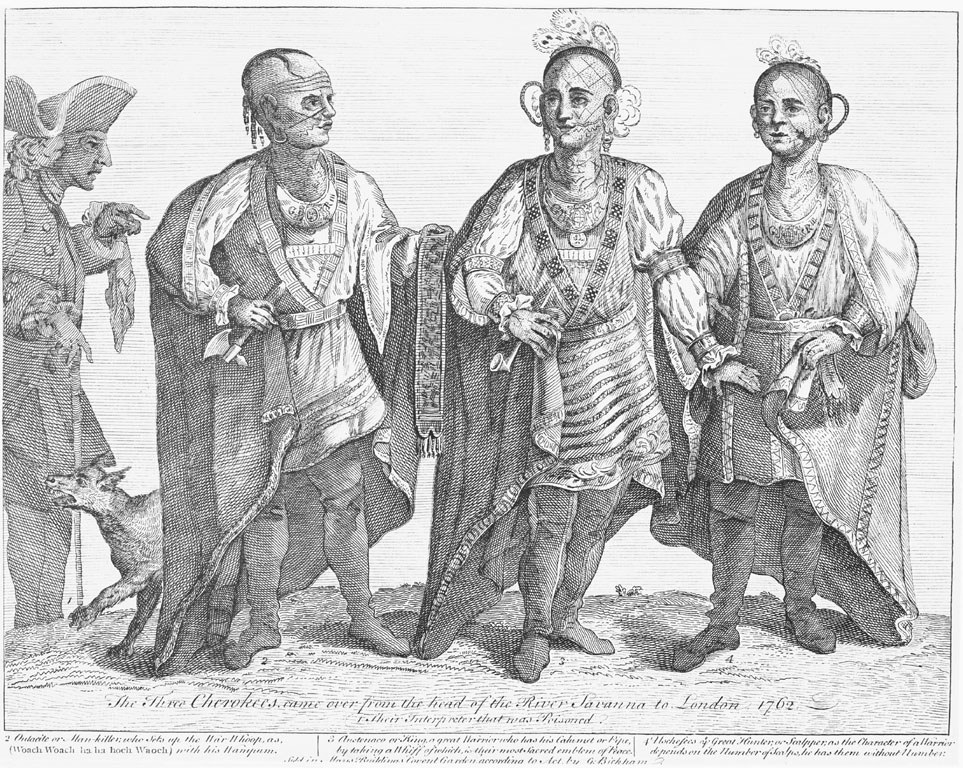
Three Cherokee diplomats in London, 1765

In the 1660s, the Cherokee had given sanctuary to a band of Shawnee. But 50 years later, from 1710 to 1715, the Cherokee and Chickasaw, allied with the English, fought the Shawnee, who were allied with the French, and forced them to move north. The Cherokee were also allied with the English and the Yamasee, and Catawba in late 1712 and early 1713, against the Tuscarora in the Second Tuscarora War. Following their defeat, most of the Tuscarora, another Iroquoian-language tribe, migrated north to New York. By 1722 they had been accepted as the 6th Nation in the League of the Iroquois.

In the Southeast, the English and Cherokee began an alliance that remained strong for much of the 18th century. In January 1716, Cherokee warriors murdered a delegation of Muscogee Creek leaders who were visiting at Tugaloo, marking the Cherokee's entry into the Yamasee War. This ended in 1717 with peace treaties between South Carolina and the Creek. Hostility and sporadic raids between the Cherokee and Creek continued for decades. These raids came to a head at the Battle of Taliwa in 1755 (in present-day Ball Ground, Georgia), resulting in the defeat of the Muscogee.

In 1721, the Cherokee ceded lands to South Carolina. In 1730, at Nikwasi, Sir Alexander Cumming persuaded the Cherokee to crown Moytoy of Tellico as "Emperor." Moytoy agreed to recognize King George II of Great Britain as the Cherokee protector. Seven prominent Cherokee, including Attakullakulla, traveled with Cuming back to London, England. The Cherokee delegation signed the Treaty of Whitehall with the British. Moytoy's son, Amo-sgasite (Dreadful Water) attempted to succeed him as "Emperor" in 1741, but the Cherokee elected their own leader, Old Hop of Chota (sometimes spelled or recorded as Echota).

Political power among the Cherokee remained decentralized, with towns acting autonomously. In 1735 the Cherokee were estimated to have sixty-four towns and villages and 6000 fighting men. A significant interaction between European and American peoples was embodied in the assimilation of Gottlieb Priber into Cherokee society, a German radical who advocated for a trans-tribal region-wide Indian confederation to oppose European colonization of Native land. In 1738 and 1739 smallpox epidemics broke out among the Cherokee, who had no natural immunity to the new infectious disease. It was endemic among English and European populations, who had been living (and dying) with the virus for centuries. Nearly half the Cherokee population died within a year. Many other —possibly hundreds —of Cherokee survivors committed suicide, due to the disfigurement of their skin from the disease.

From 1753 to 1755, battles broke out between the Cherokee and Muscogee over disputed hunting grounds in North Georgia. The Cherokee were victorious in the Battle of Taliwa. British soldiers built forts in Cherokee country to confront the French during the years of the French and Indian War, the North American front of the Seven Years' War in Europe. These included Fort Loudoun, along the Little Tennessee River near Chota, a major Cherokee town.

In 1756 the Cherokee fought alongside the British in the French and Indian War; however, serious misunderstandings between the two allies arose quickly, resulting in the 1760 Anglo-Cherokee War. In the peace treaty ending the Seven Years' War, Britain took over the North American territories of defeated France east of the Mississippi River. King George III issued the Royal Proclamation of 1763 forbidding British settlements west of the Appalachian crest, attempting to afford some protection from colonial encroachment to the Cherokee and other tribes, but the prohibition proved difficult to enforce.

In 1769–72, predominantly Virginian settlers squatting on Cherokee lands in Tennessee, formed the Watauga Association. In "Kentuckee", Daniel Boone and his party tried to create a settlement in what would become the Transylvania colony. Some Shawnee, Lenape (Delaware), Mingo, and Cherokee attacked a scouting and foraging party that included Boone's son. This sparked the beginning of what was known as Dunmore's War (1773–1774).

In 1776, allied with the Shawnee and led by Cornstalk, Cherokee attacked settlers in South Carolina, Georgia, Virginia, the Washington District and North Carolina in the Second Cherokee War. Nancy Ward (Overhill Cherokee and a niece of Dragging Canoe), had warned pioneer settlers of the impending attacks. European-American militias retaliated, destroying over 50 Cherokee towns. In 1777, most of the surviving Cherokee town leaders signed treaties with the newly established states during the American Revolutionary War.

Dragging Canoe and his band, however, moved to the area near present-day Chattanooga, Tennessee, establishing 11 new towns. Chickamauga was his headquarters and his band became known as the Chickamauga; some people mistakenly described them as a distinct tribe of Cherokee. From here he led fighting of a guerrilla-style war against settlers, which became known as the Cherokee–American wars. The Treaty of Tellico Blockhouse, signed 7 November 1794 with, ended the Cherokee–American wars.

== 19th century ==
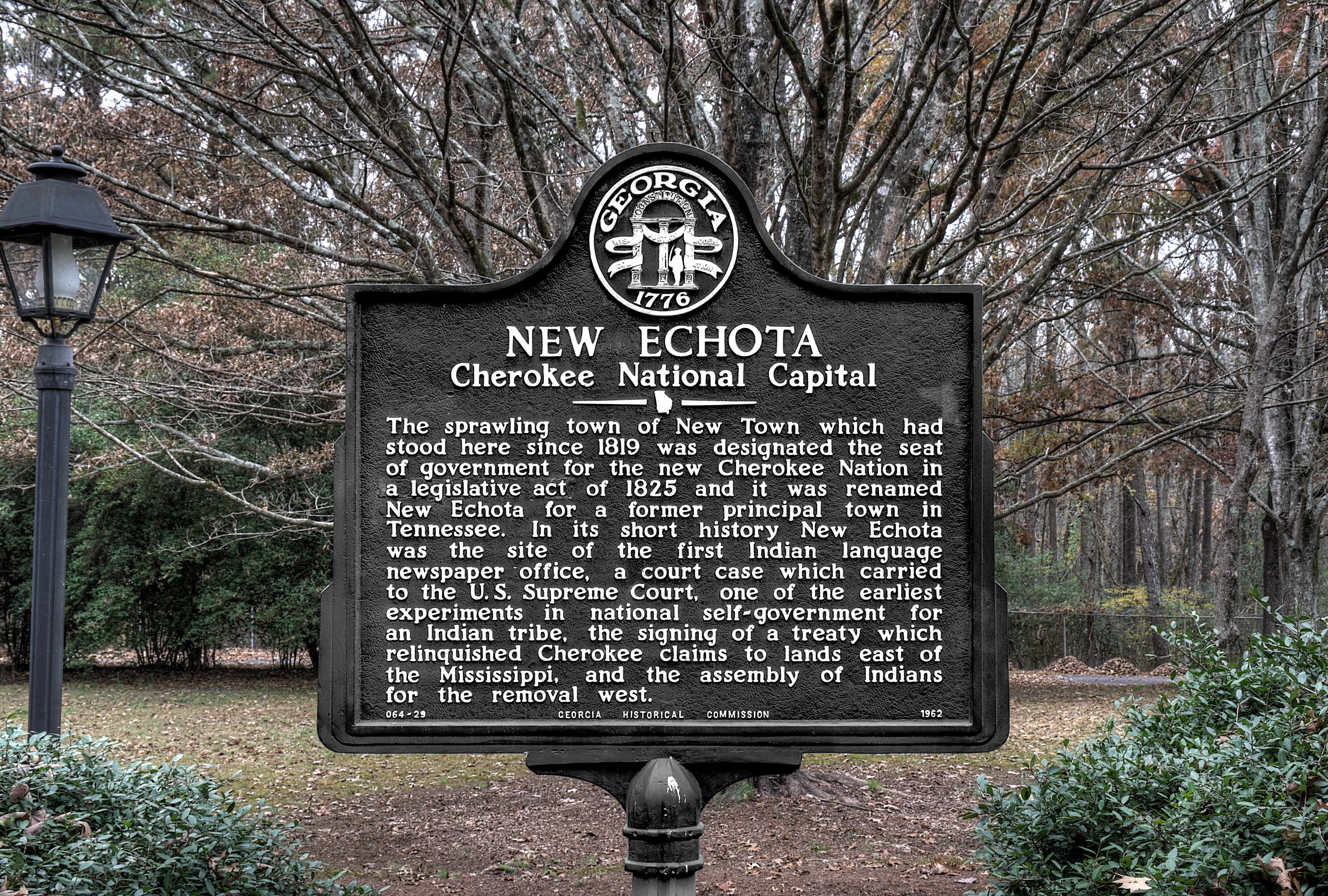
Historical marker at New Echota

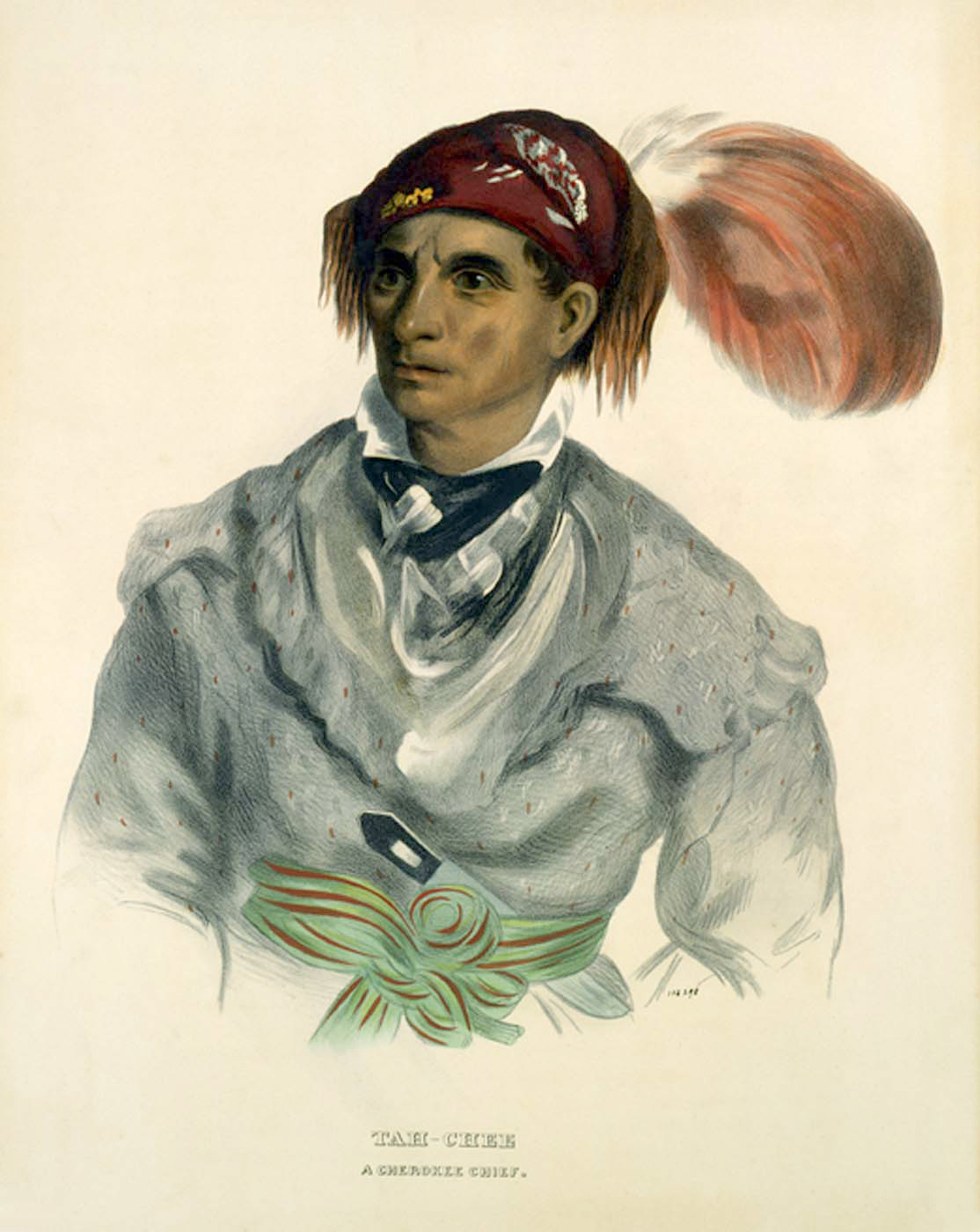
Tah-Chee (Dutch), A Cherokee Chief, 1837. Published in History of the Indian Tribes of North America.

Early in the 19th century, the Cherokees were led by Principal Chiefs Little Turkey (1788–1801), Black Fox (1801–1811), and Pathkiller (1811–1827). The seat of the Cherokee after 1788 was at Ustanali (near Calhoun, Georgia); in 1825 nearby New Echota became the Cherokee capital. Former warriors James Vann and his protégés Major Ridge (son of Pathkiller) and Charles R. Hicks, made up the "Cherokee Triumvirate" and became the dominant leaders, particularly of the younger, more acculturated generation. These leaders had had more dealings with European Americans and tended to favor acculturation, formal education, and American methods of farming.

The Cherokee attempted to deal with the United States government as one sovereign and independent nation to another, but they suffered from internal divisions plus encroachment on their land and hostility by white settlers. After several land giveaways by Cherokee leaders acting for their own benefit, the group of "young chiefs," including Ridge and Hicks, arose from 1806 to 1810 and succeeded in persuading the majority of Cherokees that their survival as a people depended upon unity and tribal ownership of their lands. In 1816–1817, Andrew Jackson led an effort to force the Cherokee to migrate west of the Mississippi River and surrender their lands to the U.S. government. Jackson's attempt led to the Cherokee adopting a political reform that has been called "the first Cherokee constitution." The reform moved away from traditional decision making and decentralized power to establishing a Cherokee nation based on laws, institutions, and centralized authority. The reform also prohibited any additional cession of Cherokee lands to the U.S. government without the consent of a National Committee representing all 54 Cherokee towns.

In 1827 the Cherokees adopted a constitution, similar to that of the U.S., which called for a bicameral legislature, an executive leader, and an independent judiciary. The constitution delineated the boundaries of Cherokee land and, in 1829, the Cherokee government imposed a death penalty on anyone who sold Cherokee land illegally.

The Cherokee continued to be creative. Sequoyah began to develop his writing system, the Cherokee syllabary, about 1808. He is one of the few individuals from a pre-literate society to create an independent and effective writing system. In the 21st century, carvings representing several symbols of the syllabary were discovered in a Kentucky cave, a sacred site of a burial of a Cherokee chief. A nearby carved date may be 1808 or 1818. Soon after this, Sequoyah moved with his people to Alabama, where he completed his syllabary by 1821 and began to promote it.

Facing removal, members of the Lower Cherokee, who lived in areas of the Piedmont of North Carolina and Georgia, were the first to move west. Remaining Lower Town leaders, such as Young Dragging Canoe and Sequoyah, were strong advocates of voluntary relocation in order to preserve the Cherokee people, as they believed that the increasing number of European-American settlers, backed by the military of the US, were too much to resist.

=== Removal era ===
In 1815, the US government established a Cherokee Reservation in Arkansas. The reservation boundaries extended from north of the Arkansas River to the southern bank of the White River. The Bowl, Sequoyah, Spring Frog, and Tatsi (Dutch) and their bands settled there. These Cherokee became known as "Old Settlers," or Western Cherokee.

John Ross became the Principal Chief of the tribe in 1828 and remained the chief until he died in Washington, DC in 1866. During the American Civil War, he led the minority group of Cherokee who allied with the Union. He and followers withdrew because of the hostility from Cherokee who allied with the Confederacy.

==== Treaty party ====
Among the Cherokee in the early 19th century, John Ross led the battle to resist their removal from their lands in the Southeast. Ross's supporters, commonly referred to as the "National Party," were opposed by a group known as the "Ridge Party" or the "Treaty Party". The Treaty Party, believing that the Cherokee could get the best deal from the US by signing a treaty and negotiating terms, represented the people by signing the Treaty of New Echota. They believed that removal was finally inevitable, given the numbers and might of the Americans. Among the terms and conditions for removal, they agreed to cede much of the remaining Cherokee lands in the Southeast, in exchange for lands in Indian Territory, plus annuities, supplies and other incentives.

==== Trail of Tears ====
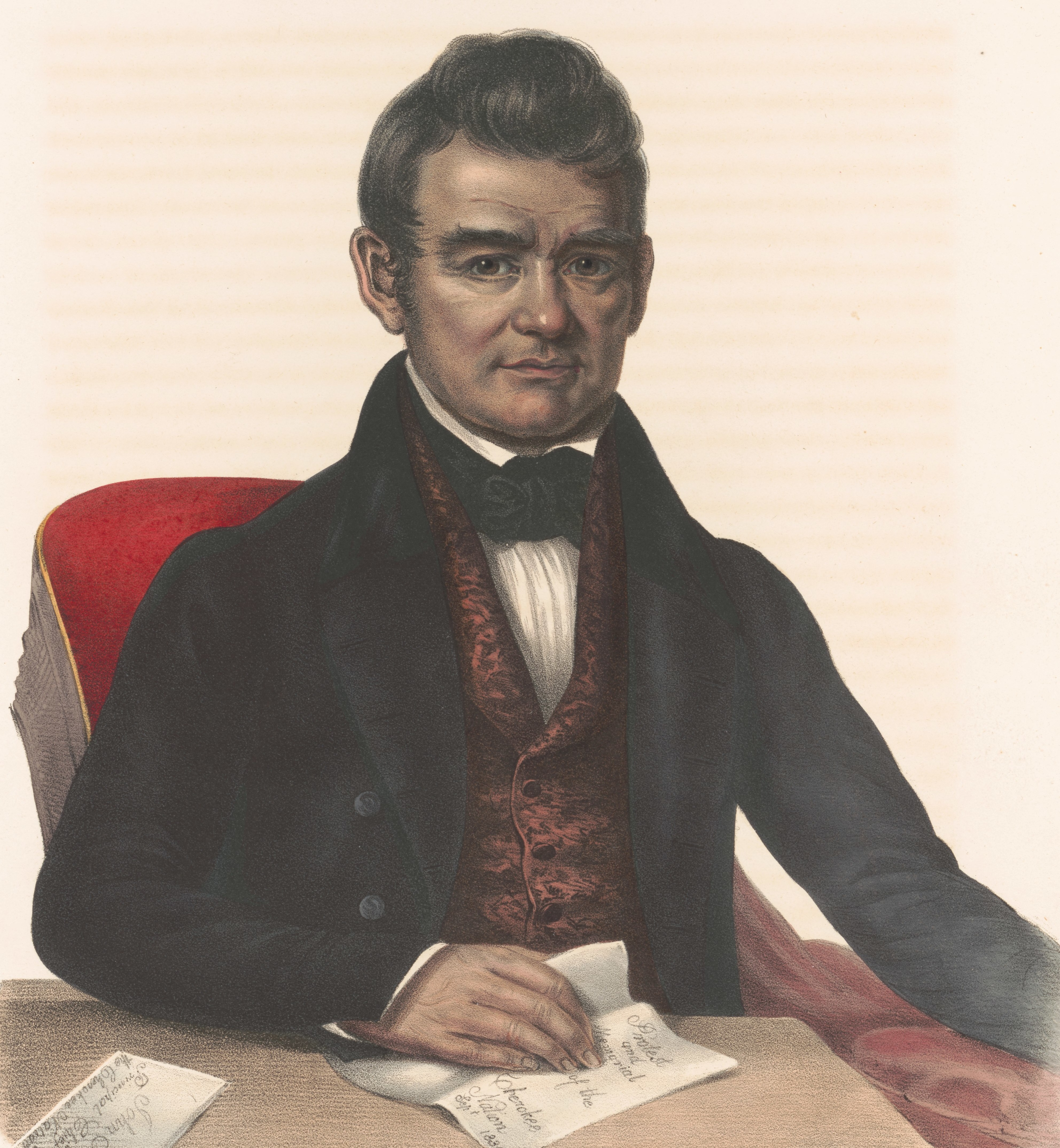
Chief John Ross, ca. 1840

Cherokees were displaced from their ancestral lands in northern Georgia and the Carolinas in a period of rapidly expanding white population. Some of the rapid expansion was due to a gold rush around Dahlonega, Georgia in the 1830s. President Andrew Jackson said removal policy was an effort to prevent the Cherokee from facing extinction, which he said was the fate of "the Mohegan, the Narragansett, and the Delaware". There is ample evidence that the Cherokee were adapting modern farming techniques. A late 20th-century analysis shows that their area was in general in a state of economic surplus. Jackson was under immense pressure from European Americans who wanted to take over and exploit the Cherokee lands for themselves.

In June 1830, a delegation of Cherokee led by Chief Ross brought their grievances about tribal sovereignty over state government to the US Supreme Court in the Cherokee Nation v. Georgia case. In the case Worcester v. Georgia, the United States Supreme Court held that Cherokee Native Americans were entitled to federal protection from the actions of state governments. Worcester v. Georgia is considered one of the most important decisions in law dealing with Native Americans But the Georgia government essentially ignored it, and removal pressure continued.

The majority of Cherokees were forcibly relocated westward to Indian Territory in 1838–1839, a migration known as the Trail of Tears or in Cherokee ᏅᎾ ᏓᎤᎳ ᏨᏱ or Nvna Daula Tsvyi (Cherokee: The Trail Where They Cried). This took place under the authority of the Indian Removal Act of 1830. The harsh treatment the Cherokee received at the hands of white settlers caused some to enroll to emigrate west. As some Cherokees were slaveholders, they took enslaved African-Americans with them west of the Mississippi. Intermarried European-Americans and missionaries also walked the Trail of Tears.

On June 22, 1839, in the Cherokee Nation, Indian Territory, Major Ridge, John Ridge and Elias Boudinot were assassinated by a party of twenty-five Ross supporters. They included Daniel Colston, John Vann, Archibald Spear, James Spear, Joseph Spear, Hunter, and others. They had considered the Treaty of New Echota to be an attempt to sell communal lands, a capital offense. Stand Watie was among the men who were attacked, but he survived and escaped to Arkansas.

==== Eastern Band ====
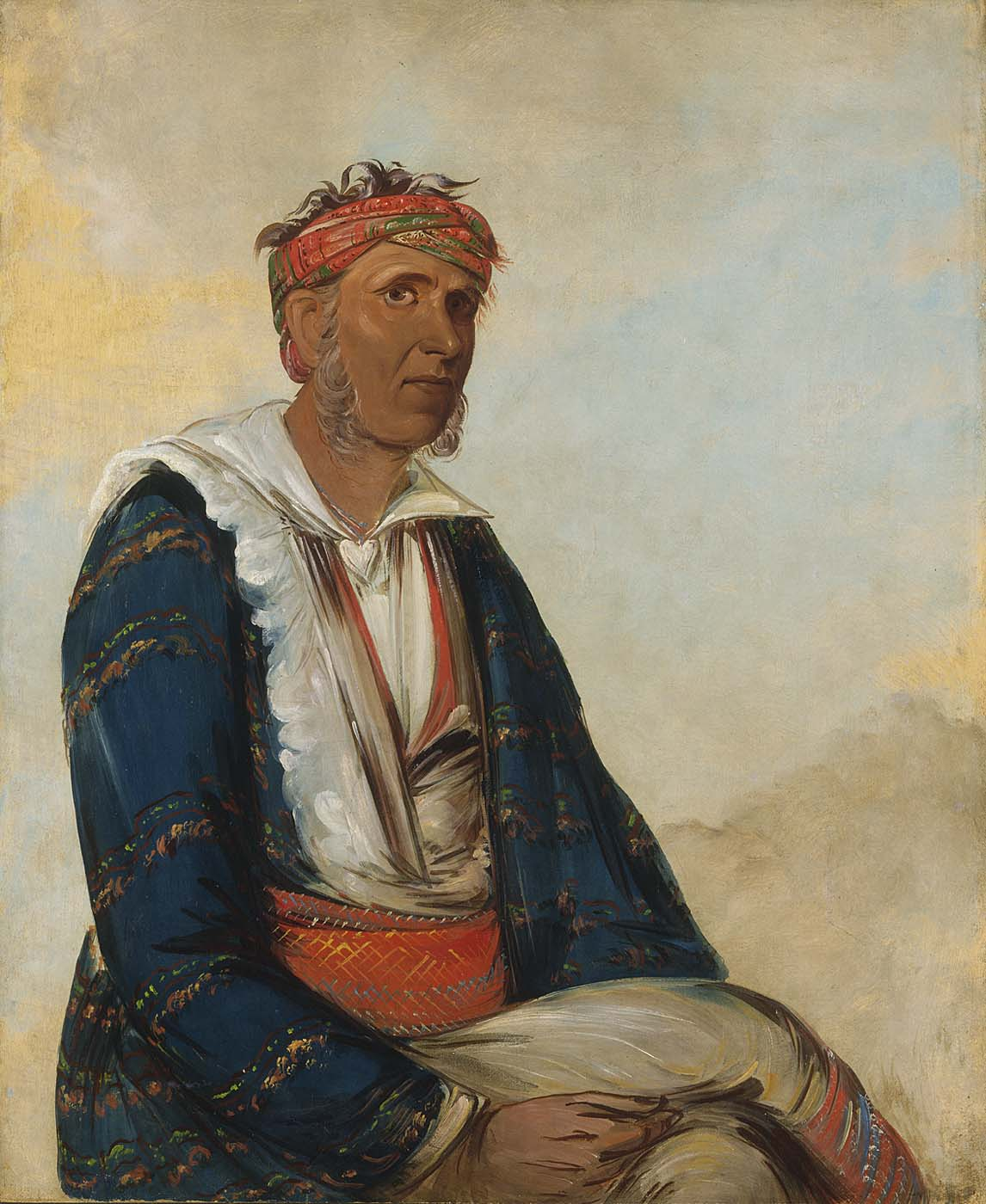
Cól-lee, a Band Chief, painted by George Catlin, 1834.

Some Cherokee in the western area of North Carolina were able to evade removal, and they became the East Band of Cherokee Indians. William Holland Thomas, a white storeowner and state legislator from Jackson County, North Carolina, helped more than 600 Cherokee from Qualla Town to obtain North Carolina citizenship. As they were willing to give up tribal citizenship, they were exempted from forced removal. Over 400 other Cherokee either hid from Federal troops in the remote Snowbird Mountains, under the leadership of Tsali (ᏣᎵ), or negotiated directly with the state government to stay locally. Many were from the former Valley Towns area around the Cheoah River. An additional 400 Cherokee stayed on reserves in Southeast Tennessee, North Georgia, and Northeast Alabama, as citizens of their respective states. Many were of mixed-blood or mixed-race descent, and some were Cherokee women married to white men, and their families. Together, these groups were the ancestors of most of the current members of what is now one of three federally recognized Cherokee tribes, the Eastern Band of Cherokee Indians.

=== Civil War ===
The American Civil War was devastating for both East and Western Cherokee. Those Cherokee aided by William Thomas in North Carolina became the Thomas Legion of Cherokee Indians and Highlanders, fighting for the Confederacy in the American Civil War. The Cherokee in Indian Territory split into Confederate (the majority) and Union factions. They were influenced both by many leaders being slaveholders and by Confederate promises to establish an Indian state if they won the war. There was warfare within the tribe, and many Union supporters escaped to Kansas to survive.

=== Reconstruction and late 19th century ===
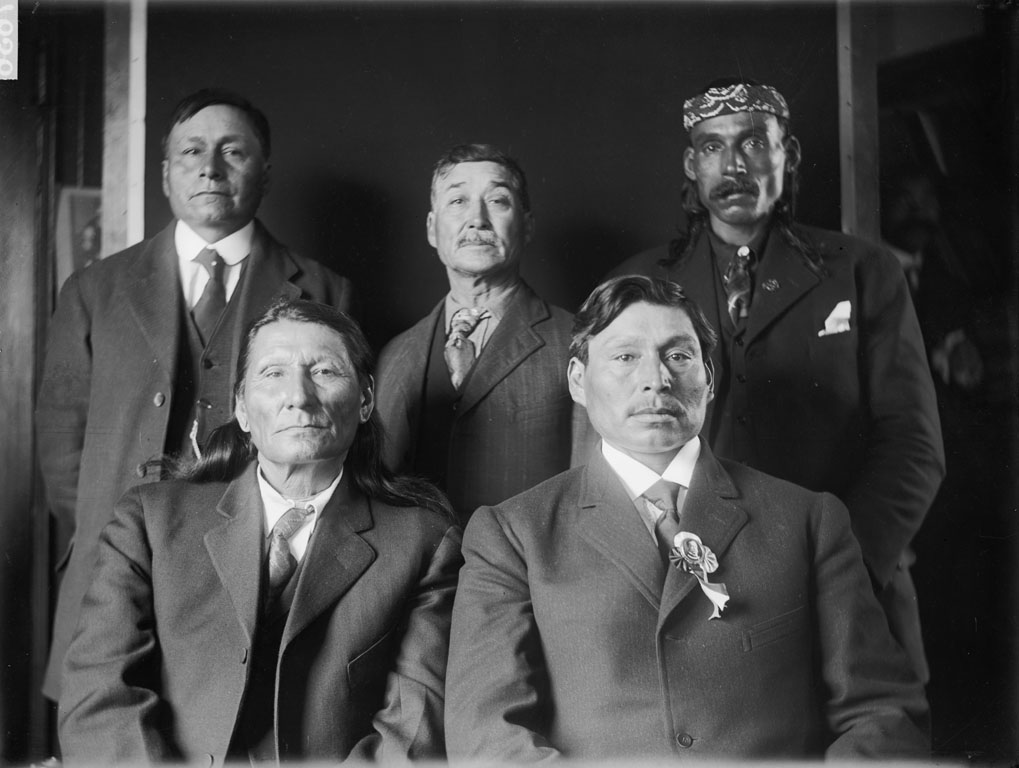
Group of Cherokee, Yankton, and Sisseton 1909.

The United States required the Cherokee and other tribes that had allied with the Confederacy to make new treaties. Among the new terms was a requirement to emancipate their slaves, and to provide citizenship to those freedmen who wanted to remain with the Cherokee Nation. If they went to US territory, the African Americans would become US citizens. By an 1866 treaty with the US government, the Cherokee agreed to grant tribal citizenship to freedmen who had been held by them as slaves. Both before and after the Civil War, some Cherokee intermarried or had relationships with African Americans, just as they had with whites, and there were numerous Black Cherokee. Often the identity of the mother influenced whether children were brought up in Cherokee or African-American culture and identity. Many Cherokee Freedmen became active politically within the tribe.

The US government also acquired the Cherokee to grant easement rights to the western part of the territory, which became the Oklahoma Territory, for the construction of railroads. Development and settlers followed the railroads. By the late 19th century, the government believed that Native Americans would be better off and more readily assimilated if each family owned its own land, in the widespread model of subsistence farming in the US. The Dawes Act of 1887 provided for the breakup of communal tribal lands and allotments to individual heads of households of tribal members. Native Americans were registered on the Dawes Rolls and allotted land from the common reserve. This also opened up later sales of land by individuals to people outside the tribe.

Map of the present-day Cherokee Nation Tribal Jurisdiction Area (red)

The Curtis Act of 1898 advanced the break-up of Native American government. For the Oklahoma Territory, this meant abolition of the Cherokee courts and governmental systems by the U.S. Federal Government. This was seen as necessary before the Oklahoma and Indian territories could be admitted as a state, which was being promoted by many speculators.

By the late 19th century, the Eastern Band of Cherokees were laboring under the constraints of a segregated society in the South. In the aftermath of Reconstruction, conservative white Democrats regained power in North Carolina and other southern states. They proceeded to effectively disfranchise all blacks and many poor whites by new constitutions and laws related to voter registration and elections. They passed Jim Crow laws that divided society into "white" and "colored", mostly to control freedmen, but the Native Americans were included on the colored side. They suffered the same racial segregation and disfranchisement as did former slaves and their children. Blacks and Native Americans would not regain their rights as US citizens until the Civil Rights Movement and passage of national civil rights legislation in the mid-1960s.

== Notable Cherokees in history ==
- Attakullakulla (ca. 1708-ca. 1777), diplomat to Britain, headman of Chota and chief
- Bob Benge (ca. 1762–1794), warrior of the "Lower Cherokee" during the Cherokee–American wars
- Elias Boudinot, Galagina (1802–1839), statesman, orator, and editor, founded the first Cherokee newspaper, the Cherokee Phoenix
- Ned Christie (1852–1892), statesman, Cherokee Nation senator, infamous outlaw
- Rear Admiral Joseph J. Clark (1893–1971), United States Navy, highest ranking Native American in the US military
- Doublehead, Taltsuska (d. 1807), war leader during the Cherokee–American wars, led the "Lower Cherokee", signed land deals with the U.S.
- Dragging Canoe, Tsiyugunsini (1738–1792), general during the 2nd Cherokee War, principal chief of the Chickamauga (or "Lower Cherokee")
- Franklin Gritts, Cherokee artist who taught at Haskell Institute and served on the USS Franklin
- Charles R. Hicks (d. 1827), Second Principal Chief to Pathkiller in the early 17th century, de facto Principal Chief from 1813 to 1827
- Junaluska (ca. 1775–1868), veteran of the Creek War, who saved future president, Andrew Jackson's, life
- Oconostota, Aganstata (ca. 1710–1783), "Beloved Man", war chief during the Anglo-Cherokee War
- Ostenaco, Ustanakwa (ca. 1703–1780), war chief, diplomat to Britain, founded the town of Ultiwa
- Major Ridge Ganundalegi or "Pathkiller" (ca.1771–1839), veteran of the Cherokee–American wars, signer of the Treaty of New Echota
- John Ridge, Skatlelohski (1792–1839), son of Major Ridge, statesman, New Echota Treaty signer
- Clement V. Rogers (1839–1911), Cherokee senator, judge, cattleman, member of the Oklahoma Constitutional Convention
- Will Rogers, Cherokee entertainer, roper, journalist, philosopher and author
- John Ross, Guwisguwi (1790–1866), Principal Chief in the east (during the Removal) and in the west
- Sequoyah (ca. 1767–1843), inventor of the Cherokee syllabary
- Nimrod Jarrett Smith, Tsaladihi (1837–1893), Principal Chief of the Eastern Band, Civil War veteran
- William Holland Thomas, Wil' Usdi (1805–1893), a non-Native, but adopted into the tribe; founding Principal Chief of the Eastern Band of Cherokee Indians
- James Vann (ca. 1765–1809), Scottish-Cherokee, highly successful businessman and veteran
- Stand Watie, Degataga (1806–1871), signer of the Treaty of New Echota, last Confederate general to surrender in the American Civil War
- Moses Whitmire (ca. 1848–1884), Trustee for the Cherokee Freedmen of the Cherokee Nation and who brought suit on September 26, 1891, on behalf of the Cherokee nation against the United States Government to protect the rights and citizenship of the Cherokee under the Treaty between the United States Government and the Cherokee Nation, of July 19, 1866. This was taken all the way to the U.S. Supreme Court and judgement was awarded in the amount of $903,365 to the Cherokee Nation on March 18, 1895.

== See also ==
- Ani-kutani
- Black Indians in the United States
- Cherokee
- Cherokee Clans
- Cherokee Female Seminary
- Cherokee Heritage Center
- Cherokee language
- Cherokee Male Seminary
- Cherokee military history
- Cherokee mythology
- Cherokee society
- Gadugi
- Keetoowah
- Keetoowah Nighthawk Society
- Original Keetoowah Society
- Stomp dance
- Timeline of Cherokee history
- Trail of Tears
