= Cherokee calendar =

Lunar calendar marked by 13 moon cycles of 28 days

The Cherokee calendar is traditionally defined as a Lunar calendar marked by 13 moon cycles of 28 days. (Note: This traditional definition of a moon cycle, however, is shorter than the synodic month by approximately one and a half days.) Each cycle was accompanied by a ceremony. In order to rectify the Cherokee calendar with that of the Julian calendar, these cycles were reduced to 12. The seasonal round of ceremonies was integral to Cherokee society. It was considered an important spiritual element for social cohesion and a way to bring all the Cherokee clans together.

The Cherokee, like many other Native tribes, used the number of scutes on the backs of certain species of turtles to determine their calendar cycle. The scutes around the edge added up to 28, the same number of days as in a lunar cycle, while the center contained 13 larger scutes, representing the 13 moon cycles of a year.

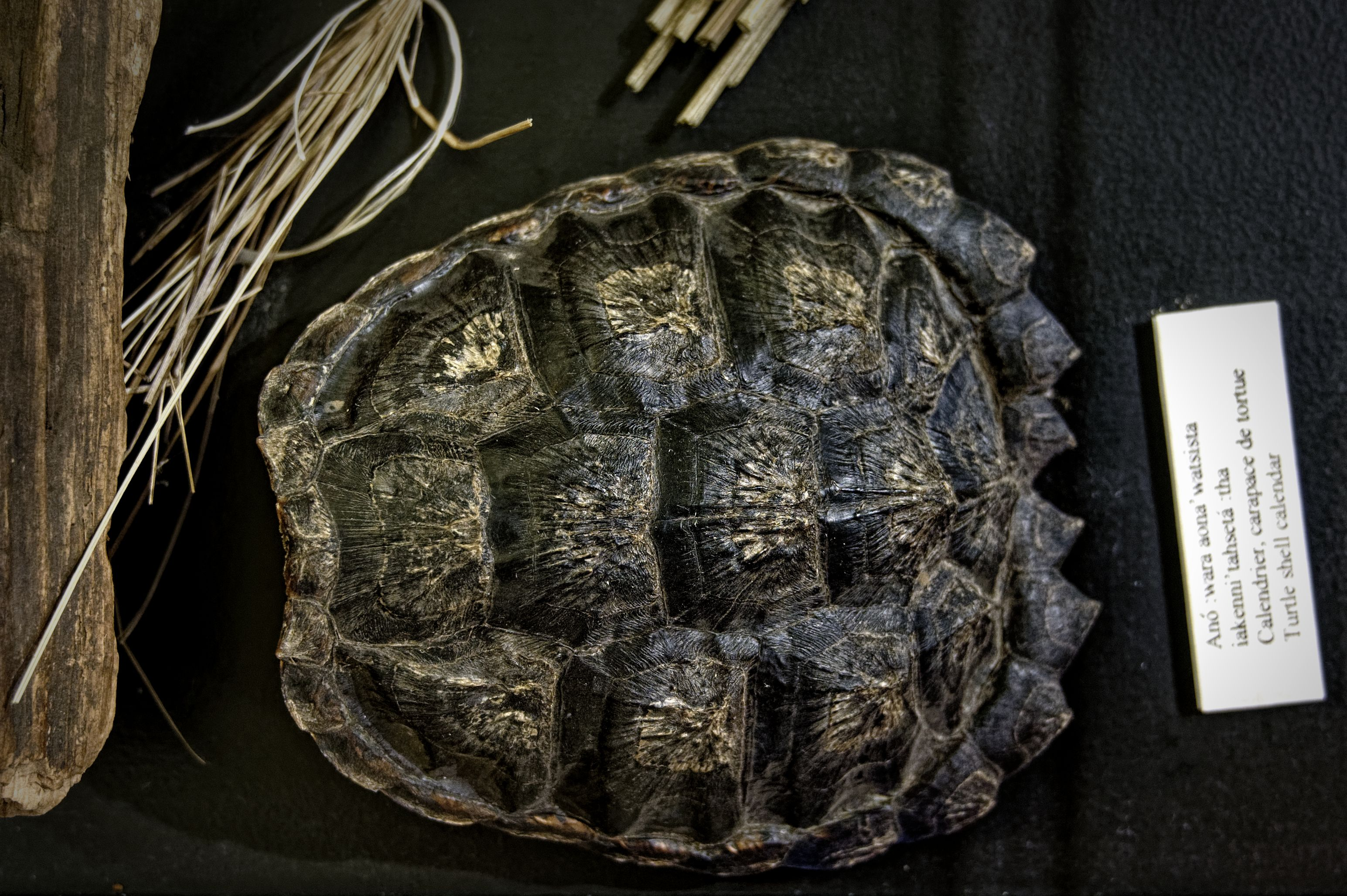
Turtle shell calendar

== Thirteen seasonal moon ceremonies ==
Cherokee priests, known as ᎠᏂᎫᏔᏂ (A-ni-ku-ta-ni), defined the 13 ceremonies as listed below. The common names in English are listed followed by their names in Cherokee syllabics, the Cherokee name's transcription in the Latin alphabet in parentheses, and a literal translation of the Cherokee name for some of the moons.

- Cold Moon – ᏅᏓ ᎧᎾᏬᎦ (Nv-da Ka-na-wo-ga)
- Bone Moon – ᏅᏓ ᎪᎳ (Nv-da Ko-la); lit. 'So little food the people eat bone marrow soup'
- Wind Moon – ᏅᏓ ᎤᏃᎴ (Nv-da U-no-le); lit. 'Winds prepare the land for renewal'
- Flower Moon – ᏅᏓ ᎠᏥᎷᏍᎩ (Nv-da A-tsi-lu-s-gi); lit. 'Flowers bloom and the earth is renewed'
- Planting Moon – ᏅᏓ ᎦᏢᏍᎦ (Nv-da Ga-hlv-sga); lit. 'Putting it in a hole'
- Green Corn Moon – ᏅᏓ ᏎᎷᎢᏤᎢᏳᏍᏗ (Nv-da Se-lu-i-tse-i-yu-s-di); lit. 'The corn is up'
- Corn in Tassel Moon – ᏅᏓ ᎤᏥᏣᏔ (Nv-da U-tsi-dsa-ta); lit. 'The corn is showing a tassel'
- Ripe Corn Moon – ᏅᏓ ᏎᎷᎤᏩᏅᏌ (Nv-da Se-lu-u-wa-nv-sa)
- End of Fruit Moon – ᏅᏓ ᎤᏓᏔᏅᎠᎩᏍᏗ ᎤᎵᏍᏛ (Nv-da U-da-ta-nv-a-gi-s-di U-li-s-dv)
- Nut Moon – ᏅᏓ ᎤᏓᏔᏅ (Nv-da U-da-ta-nv)
- Harvest Moon – ᏅᏓ ᏥᎠᎶᎭ (Nv-da Tsi-yah-lo-ha)
- Hunting Moon – ᏅᏓ ᎦᏃᎭᎵᏙᎭ (Nv-da Ga-no-ha-li-do-ha)
- Snow Moon – ᏅᏓ ᎫᏘᎭ (Nv-da Gu-ti-ha); lit. 'First snowfall'

== Cherokee names for Julian calendar months ==
With the expansion of Euro-American influences in North America, the Cherokee adapted their calendar to the widely accepted Julian calendar. As such the 13-moon phase calendar was gradually replaced by a 12-month calendar. However, the months were still associated with ceremonies and are still practiced by traditional Cherokee today.

Below is a list of months according to the Julian calendar followed by their Latin transliterated Kituwah and Overhill dialect name and then Cherokee syllabics for each dialect.

Month	Kituwah Name ^{1}	Kituwah Syllabics	Overhill Name^{1}	Overhill Syllabics
January	U-no-lv-ta-na	ᎤᏃᎸᏔᎾ	U-no-lv-ta-ni	ᎤᏃᎸᏔᏂ
February	Ka-ga-li	ᎧᎦᎵ	Ka-ga-li	ᎧᎦᎵ
March	A-nvh-yi	ᎠᏅᏱ	A-na-yi-li-sv	ᎠᎾᏱᎵᏒ
April	Ka-woh-ni	ᎧᏬᏂ	Gu-wo-ni	ᎫᏬᏂ
May	A-n(i)-s-gv-ti	ᎠᏂᏍᎨᏘ	A-na-s-gv-ti	ᎠᎾᏍᎬᏘ
June	De-ha-lu-yi	ᏕᎭᎷᏱ	De-ha-lu-yi	ᏕᎭᎷᏱ
July	Ku-ye-gwo-na	ᎫᏰᏉᎾ	Gu-ye-quo-ni	ᎫᏰᏉᏂ
August	Ga-lo-ne-e	ᎦᎶᏁᎡ	Ga-lo-ni	ᎦᎶᏂ
September	Du-li-s-di	ᏚᎵᏍᏗ	Du-li-s-di	ᏚᎵᏍᏗ
October	Du-ni-n(i)h-di	ᏚᏂᏂᏗ	Du-ni-no-di	ᏚᏂᏃᏗ
November	Nv-da-de-gwa	ᏅᏓᏕᏆ	Nv-da-de-qua	ᏅᏓᏕᏆ
December	U-s-ki-ya	ᎤᏍᎩᏯ	V-s-gi-yi	ᎥᏍᎩᏱ

Below is a list of months as they appeared in ethnological studies and books of the Cherokee people from 1894 into the late 20th century, with Julian calendar name followed by Cherokee names and finally the meanings and associations:

Month	Cherokee Name	Meanings/Associations
January	Unolvtana or Unâlatŭni	"windblown"
February	Kagaʔli or Gŭgăli	"month when the stars and moon are fixed in the heavens"
March	Anvhyi	referring to strawberries (anŭ)
April	Kawohni or Kùwáni	"duck" as in "when the ducks return", "ducks swim in ponds month"
May	Anisgvti, Ansgvti,	month of strawberries or making pottery (ŭntĭ),
June	Dehaluyi,	Green Corn ceremony, blackberry month
July	Kuyegwona,	huckleberry month
August	Gaʔloni,	wild grapes month, refers to drying up of the streams
September	Dulisdi,	translation unknown, Bounding Bush Feast
October	Dunihidi, Duninhdi,	harvestime month, Great New Moon Ceremony
November	Nvdadequa, Nvdadeqwa,	big moon month
December	Vsdgiyi, Vskihyi,	translation unknown

== Seasons ==
Below are the seasons of the year with relatable names from Mooney in 1894, the Kituwah and Overhill dialects and their respective Syllabics.

Season	Name and Meaning per Mooney	Kituwah Name (Syllabics)	Overhill Name (Syllabics)
Spring	Gagéyl, "near the summer"	Go-ge-yi (ᎪᎨᏱ)	Go-ge-yi (ᎪᎨᏱ)
Summer	Gagi,	Go-gi (ᎪᎩ)	Go-gi (ᎪᎩ)
Autumn	Ulăgăhûstû (refers to falling of the leaves)	U-la-go-ho-s-di (ᎤᎳᎪᎰᏍᏗ)	U-la-go-hv-s-di (ᎤᎳᎪᎲᏍᏗ)
Winter	Gâlû	Go-la (ᎪᎳ)	Go-la (ᎪᎳ)
