= Ghigau =

Prestigious title for Cherokee women

Ghigau (Cherokee: ᎩᎦᎤ, romanized: gigau) or Agigaue (Cherokee: ᎠᎩᎦᎤᎡ) is a Cherokee prestigious title meaning "beloved woman" or "war woman".

The title was a recognition of great honor for women who made a significant impact within their community or exhibited great heroism on the battlefield. When the status of Ghigau was bestowed upon a woman, as she was given great honor and responsibility. The role has changed in Cherokee culture, but the Eastern Band of Cherokee Indians still have Beloved Women today.

== Background ==
The Ghigau title was given to extraordinary women by the Cherokee clans, and the title of great honor and responsibility was held for life. The Cherokees believed that the Great Spirit frequently spoke through the Ghigau. The Ghigau headed the Council of Women and held a voting seat in the Council of Chiefs. She was given the responsibility of prisoners and would decide their fate.

There are other similar words. For instance, the word Adageyudi (Cherokee: ᎠᏓᎨᏳᏗ) means "beloved" or "beloved woman". An even greater title would have been Chigau (Cherokee: ᏥᎦᎤ, romanized: tsigau) meaning "greatly beloved woman".

== Nancy Ward, Ghigau ==
Nancy Ward, whose Cherokee name was Nanyehi, was a notable Ghigau who was born in the Cherokee town of Chota. She was thought to be the daughter of a Cherokee woman named Tame Doe, of the Wolf Clan. Tame Doe's brother was Attakullakulla.

In 1755, the Cherokee fought against the Muscogee Creeks. During the battle, Nanyehi's first husband, Kingfisher, was killed. She was just 18 at the time, and victoriously led and fought in the battle against the Creeks. Her bravery and leadership resulted in her being bestowed with the title of Ghigau.

Nanyehi became aware of a planned attack against the white colonists during the Revolutionary War by Dragging Canoe, her cousin. She warned the colonists of the upcoming battle, which resulted in her being identified as a patriot for the Society of the Sons of the American Revolution and the Daughters of the American Revolution.

On September 11, 1808, in council Broom's town, the ancient law of blood revenge was abolished by the Cherokee national government. The Cherokee, once ruled by clan loyalty, were moving toward a republican form of government. There was no longer a place in Cherokee government for a Ghigau.

== Seneca myth ==
A Seneca myth speaks of two Cherokee Ghigau deciding the fate of a Seneca man in "A warrior cared for by wolves". "Among the Cherokees there were two women who were looked upon as the head women of the tribe. Each woman had two snakes tattooed on her lips--the upper jaws of the snakes were on the woman's upper lip, and opposite each other, the lower jaws on the lower lip in the same way. When the woman opened her mouth, the snakes seemed to open theirs. These women said, "This is the way to torment him; tie him near a fire and burn the soles of his feet till they are blistered, then let the water out of the blisters, put kernels of corn inside the skin, and chase him with clubs till he dies."

== Ghigau inspired programs ==
- The "Ghigau Scholarship" is an annual scholarship program that awards one $500.00 scholarship to a Cherokee student attending a college or university in the United States, Canada, or other Indigenous community. The scholarship is given in honor of the Cherokee Tribe and to celebrate the family of Dr. Lisa Byers and her children, Brady and Halle (all Cherokee tribal members). The scholarship is also a way of supporting the education and capacity-building of the Cherokee student population.
- Camp Ghigau is a 28-bed group home located in the mountains of upstate South Carolina serving female adolescents, ages 13–18, referred from the Department of Juvenile Justice and the Department of Social Services of South Carolina.

== Suggested reading ==
- Pat Alderman. (1978). Nancy Ward, Cherokee Chieftainess.
- Conley, Robert J. (2007). A Cherokee Encyclopedia. University of New Mexico Press. ISBN 978-0-8263-3951-5.
- Ben H. McClary. (1962).Nancy Ward: The Last Beloved Woman of the Cherokees. Tennessee Historical Quarterly 21: 352–64.
- Rader, Daniel and Janice Gould. (2003). Speak to Me Words: Essays on Contemporary American Indian Poetry. University of Arizona Press. ISBN 0-8165-2348-7.
- Suzack, Cheryl. (2010). Indigenous Women and Feminism: Politics, Activism, Culture.
