= Nancy Ward Tomb =

- U.S. National Register of Historic Places
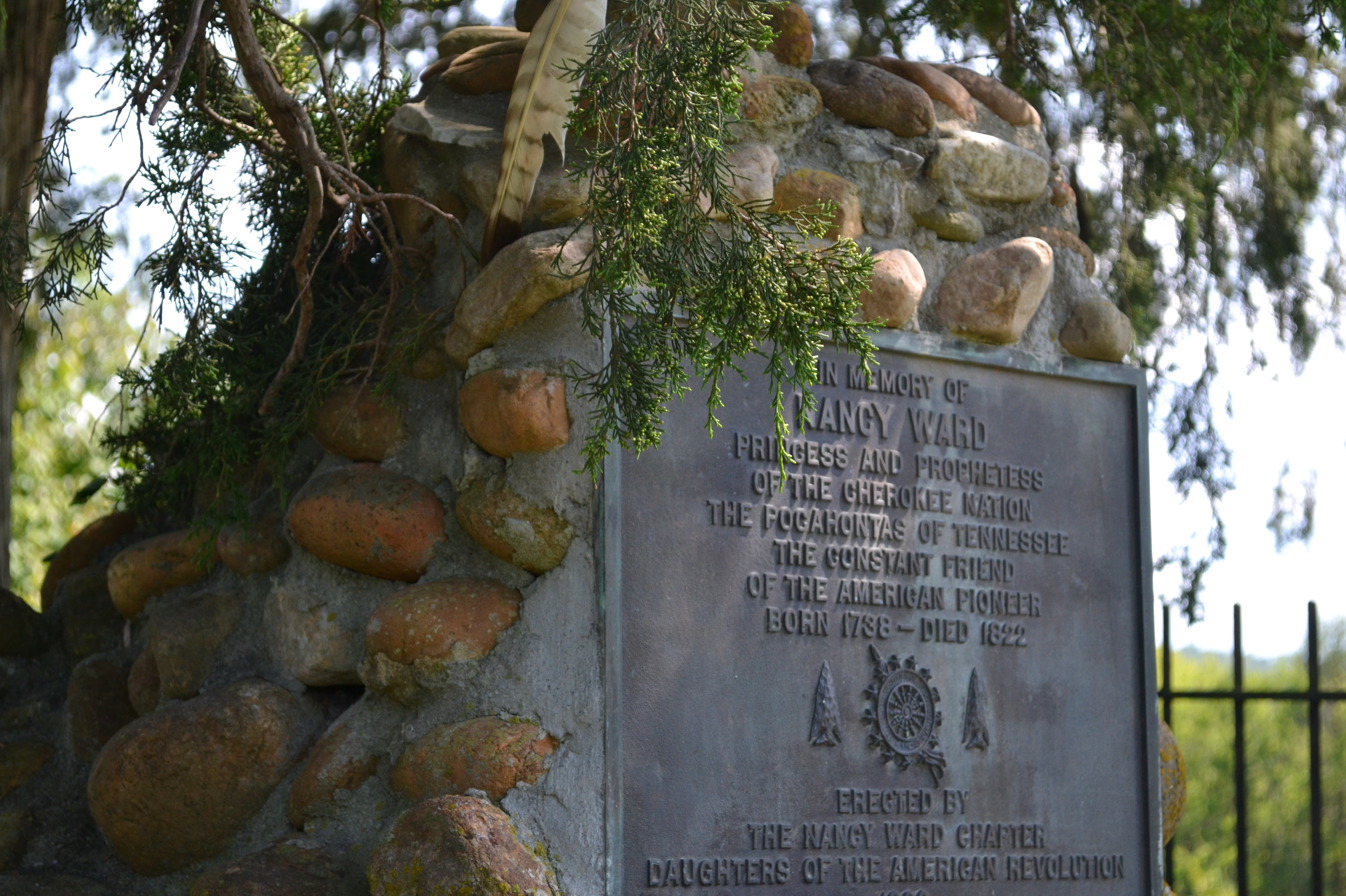

- Location within Tennessee Location within the United States
- Nearest city: Benton, Tennessee
- Coordinates: 35°09′51″N 84°40′50″W
- Area: 3 acres (1.2 ha)
- NRHP reference No.: 73001815
- Added to NRHP: April 11, 1973

The Nancy Ward Tomb is the tomb of Nancy Ward, her brother and her son near Benton, Tennessee, U.S. In 1923, a plaque reading "Princess and Prophetess of the Cherokee Nation, the Pocahontas of Tennessee, and a constant friend of the American Pioneer" was installed by the Nancy Ward Chapter of the Daughters of the American Revolution. It has been listed on the National Register of Historic Places since April 11, 1973.
