= Battle of Taliwa =

1755 battle between Cherokee and Chickasaw forces in present-day Georgia, United States

Coordinates: 34°19′20″N 84°20′20″W

| Date | 1755 |
| Location | Ball Ground, Georgia |
| Result | Cherokee victory |

Belligerents
| Eastern Band of Cherokee Nation | Muscogee Creek Nation |

Commanders and leaders
| Oconostota | Unknown |

Strength
| 500 | 1,000 |

Casualties and losses
| Unknown | Unknown |

The Battle of Taliwa was fought in Ball Ground, Georgia, in 1755. The battle was part of a larger campaign of the Cherokee against the Muscogee Creek people, where a contingent of 500 Cherokee warriors led by war chief Oconostota defeated the Muscogee Creek people and pushed them south from their northern Georgia homelands, allowing the Cherokee to begin settling in the region.

== Background ==
The Cherokee and Creek had a longstanding rivalry within the territory of Georgia, coming from decades of violent exchanges between 1715-1753, a period known as the Creek-Cherokee War. The Creek held the territories in Georgia and Alabama while the Cherokee held territories in Tennessee and North and South Carolina. The culmination of the Yamasee War (1715-1717), where a number of native tribes launched attacks in South Carolina against settlers, furthered the tension between the Cherokee and Creeks after a Creek delegation was murdered in the Cherokee town of Tugaloo in 1716.

The Yamasee War began in 1715 when a delegation sent by the Board of Commissioners was killed by the Yamasee, known as the Pocotaligo Massacre. The conflict grew as several Native American nations began rising up against South Carolina, including the Creek, Cherokee, Chocktaw, Chickasaw, and others, and organizing attacks against traders and militia.

Creek and Cherokee internal politics were heavily divided. The Upper Creek were reluctant to join the war while the Ochese Creek were strategizing on the next phase, trying to organize assaults against the settlers. The Cherokee were also divided in their support for the war. The Lower Cherokee supported the war against South Carolina and the British while the Overhill Cherokee supported South Carolina and the war against the Creek. In 1715, a Cherokee alliance was made with South Carolina, however, the division still split the nation. The Cherokee alliance with South Carolina repelled any Creek invasion plan and small raids were carried out between 1715-1716.

With the Cherokee alliance with South Carolina, tensions grew between the Creek and Cherokee nation. The Tugaloo Massacre deteriorated relations further as a delegation of the Creek were killed in the Tugaloo by the Cherokee, sparking a war between the two nations.

Due to the vast number of nations involved in the war, there was no definitive end date to the conflict as the turmoil continued for decades after the war. The Yamasee were forced to relocate due to losing a quarter of their forces while South Carolina worked to rebuild diplomatic relations with local Native tribes. Following a series of peace treaties between South Carolina and the Creek between 1716-1717, decades of conflict continued between the Cherokee and Creek with raids and attacks until 1755, when the Battle of Taliwa took place. Many tribes involved in the conflict never agreed to peace and remained armed.

== Battle ==
The battle took place in Ball Ground, Georgia, near the Long-Swamp Creek and the Etowah River. Ball Ground is located in present-day Cherokee County. An army of 500 Cherokee warriors led by the Cherokee war chief Osconostota met against a larger contingent of around 1,000 Creek warriors. According to accounts from the Cherokee, the Creek forces attacked their lines five times and caused numerous casualties. Initially, the Cherokee forces were pushed back, but rallied and pushed onto the offensive, causing the Creeks to run from cover and into the open. After numerous losses, the Creeks retreated.

Nanyehi, also known as Nancy Ward, was a teenager who followed her Cherokee warrior husband, Kingfisher, into battle. She chewed on bullets to make them more ragged and participated in the fighting once her husband was killed. She took up arms and rallied the Cherokee, leading a charge towards the Creek and causing them to flee. Because of her actions, Nanyehi was awarded a captured slave and given the title Ghigau, meaning "Beloved Woman" or "War Woman", which is one of the highest honors the Cherokee Nations bestowed upon women. She was allowed to sit on council meetings and make decisions as part of their leadership, later becoming a political leader for the Cherokee.

Some scholars have noted that all the details of the battle seem to come from oral tradition, specifically from one James Wafford, who claimed to have heard them as a child from a trader named Brian Ward. According to Wafford, Ward had witnessed the battle as a young man, and told his story in 1815, about 60 years later.

== Aftermath ==
The conflict ended when the Cherokee and Creeks made peace in 1759, prior to the start of the Anglo-Cherokee War between the British in South Carolina and the Cherokee. The Creeks also assisted the Cherokee in the conflict, providing manpower and ammunition. After the defeat, the Creeks abandoned the northern territories in Georgia and parts of Alabama and relocated south. A town located near the Nottely River, near present-day Blairsville, Georgia, was abandoned as many Creeks began to settle in more congregated and permanent settlements. The Cherokee were able to expand their territory and began settling in the northern parts of Georgia.

The only remaining settlement in the region belonging to the Creeks was located near present-day Rome, Georgia. The Creeks were forced to retreat south of the Chattahoochee River, which became their northernmost boundary.

=== Indian Removal ===
By the beginning of the 19th century, the Cherokee Nation went through several negotiations and began to lose territory to the United States. The territory encompassing Ball Ground did not face many major encroachments from settlers until around 1820. By 1838, the Trail of Tears began, where the Cherokee Nation were forcibly removed from the entirety of northern Georgia.

Decades after the Battle of Taliwa, the Creeks faced many losses of their territory and eventually removal. After a series of treaties were made as a result of the Creek War, the Creeks lost 23 million acres of land to the United States in the Treaty of Fort Jackson in 1814. By 1825, a treaty signed by Chief William McIntosh and Georgia Governor Michael Troup saw further losses of all Lower Creek land in Georgia. Although the Treaty of Indian Springs was deemed illegal by President John Quincy Adams, a subsequent negotiation took place and culminated in the Treaty of Washington. By 1827, most of the Muscogee Creek Nation were removed from Georgia entirely.

== Landmarks ==
=== Highway marker ===
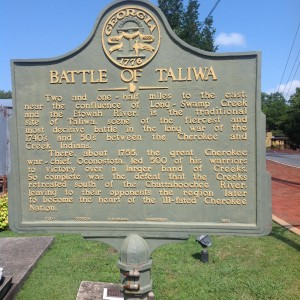
Battle of Taliwa highway marker

The site of the battle has been designated as a Georgia State Historical Landmark. Georgia State Highway 372 passes near it, which is by Ball Ground's downtown railroad crossing.

A 1953 highway marker states:

BATTLE OF TALIWA

Two and one-half miles to the east, near the confluence of Long-Swamp Creek and the Etowah River, is the traditional site of Taliwa, scene of the fiercest and most decisive battle in the long war of the 1740s and 50s

between the Cherokee and Creek Indians.

There, about 1755, the great Cherokee war chief, Oconostota, led 500 of his warriors to victory over a larger band of Creeks. So complete was the defeat that the Creeks retreated south of the Chattahoochee River, leaving their opponents the region later to become the heart of the ill-fated Cherokee Nation.

028-1 GEORGIA HISTORICAL COMMISSION 1953.

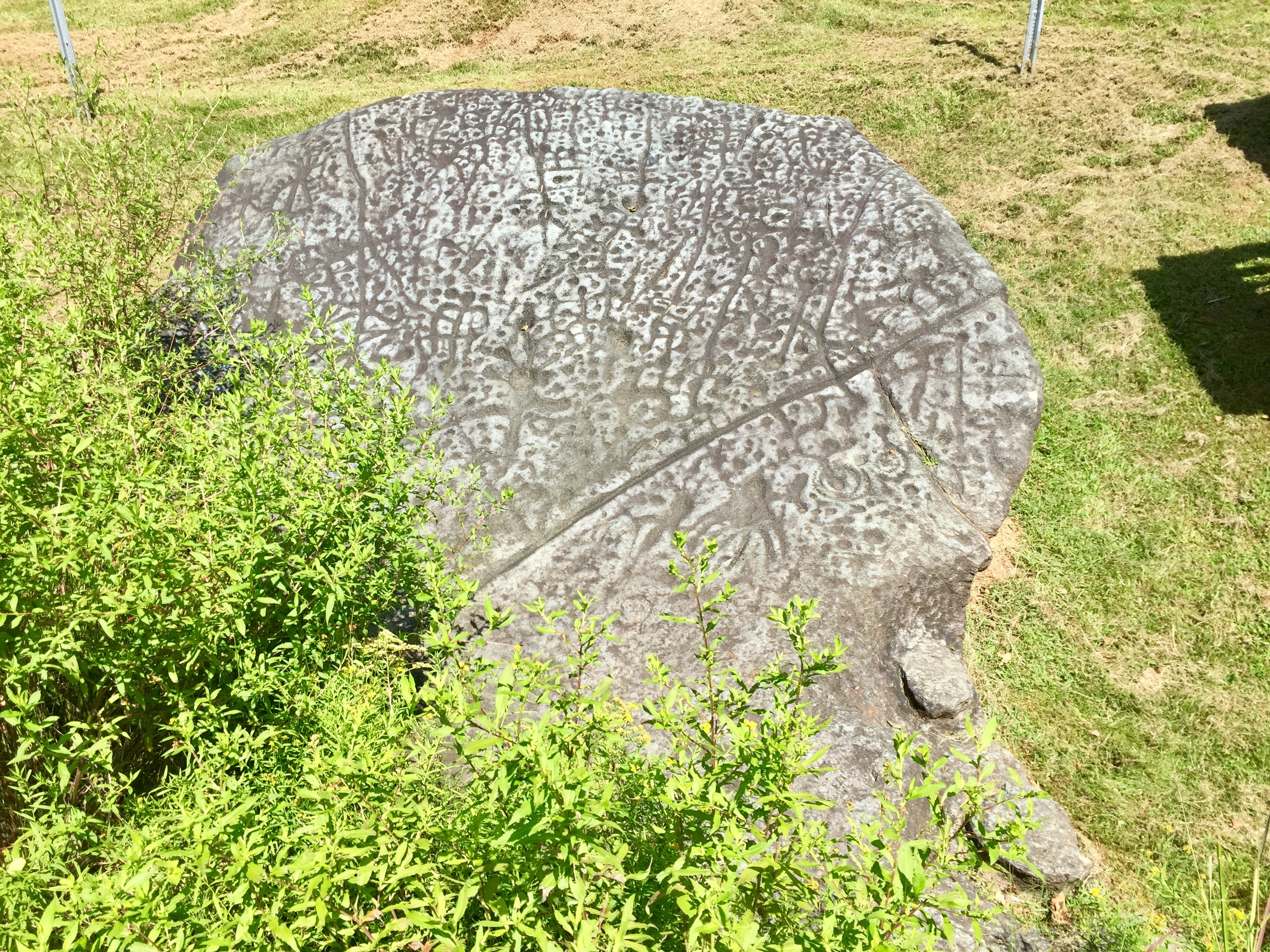
Judaculla Rock in North Carolina

=== Judaculla Rock ===
In Jackson County, North Carolina, a soapstone rock called the Judaculla Rock with petroglyph carvings was found near the Caney Fork Creek. The Judaculla Rock is known by the Cherokee to be related to the Tsu'kalu or Judaculla legend. The site is a historic landmark to the Cherokee.

Countering theories from historians believe that the carvings are a map of the Battle of Taliwa. Archeologists and geologists propose that the Judaculla Rock were remnants from a pre-historic tribe, possibly living at the end of the Last Glacial Period.
