= Nancy Ward =

Cherokee diplomat and Beloved Woman (c.1738 – c.1822)

- ᎾᏅᏰᎯ
- Pronunciation: Nanye'hi
- Born: c. 1738; Chota
- Died: c. 1823 (aged 84–85); Near Benton, Tennessee, US
- Resting place: Nancy Ward Tomb
- Spouse(s): Tsa-tlo (Kingfisher); Bryant Ward
- Children: Catherine (or Ka-Ti) Walker; Littlefellow (Hiskyteehee) later known as Fivekiller; Betsy Ward
- Relatives: Attakullakulla, uncle

Nanyehi (Cherokee: ᎾᏅᏰᎯ, romanized: Nanyehi), known in English as Nancy Ward (c.1738 – c.1823), was a Beloved Woman and political leader of the Cherokee. She advocated for peaceful coexistence with European Americans and, late in life, spoke out for Cherokee retention of tribal hunting lands. She is credited with the introduction of dairy products to the Cherokee economy.

== Life ==
Nanyehi (meaning "one who goes about") was born c. 1738 in the Cherokee chief-city, Chota (or "town of refuge"). Today, that area is within Monroe County, on the southeastern border of Tennessee. Her mother, a sister of Attakullakulla, was a member of the Wolf Clan. (Note: Though Nanyehi's mother is often referred to by historians as "Tame Doe", the name has no historical sources; it is associated with an 1895 historical novel by E. Sterling King.) According to Nanyehi's descendant, John Walker "Jack" Hildebrand, her father was "Fivekiller", who was a member of the Lenape (Delaware) tribe. (Note: Some Lenape had migrated west across the Appalachian Mountains to remove themselves from the encroaching White man, far from their traditional mid-Atlantic coastal territories.)

While a young teen, Nanyehi was married to Tsu-la (or "Kingfisher"). According to historian Emmet Starr, he was a member of the Deer Clan. By the time she was 17, Nanyehi and Kingfisher had two children, Catherine Ka-Ti Walker and Littlefellow Hiskyteehee Fivekiller.

In the 1755 Battle of Taliwa, when the Cherokee fought their traditional enemy, the Muscogee (Creek) people, Nanyehi accompanied her husband to the field, located in what is now northern Georgia. She chewed his bullets before he loaded his gun. After Kingfisher was killed in the battle, Nanyehi picked up his rifle and led the Cherokee warriors to victory.

In the late 1750s, Nanyehi married an Irish trader, Bryant Ward. She became known as Nancy, an anglicized version of her name. The couple had two daughters together, Elizabeth "Betsy" Ward, who would one day marry General Joseph Martin, and Hannah "Kezia" Ward who would go on to marry an Irish trader named John Hughes. Bryant Ward eventually left her, and returned to his base in South Carolina and his first wife. (Note: Bryant Ward's first wife was a woman of European descent. He was still married to her when he married Nanyehi.)

=== Beloved Woman and diplomat ===
For her actions at the Battle of Taliwa, the Cherokee awarded her the title of Ghigau (or "Beloved Woman"). This made her the only female voting member of the Cherokee general council. She was also named the leader of the women's clan council that authorized her to become an ambassador and negotiator for all her people.

Nanye'hi became a de facto ambassador between the Cherokee and the British and European Americans. She had learned the art of diplomacy from her maternal uncle, the influential chief Attakullakulla ("Little Carpenter"). In 1781, she was among the Cherokee leaders who met with an American delegation led by John Sevier, to discuss American settlements along the Little Pigeon River in Tennessee. Nanyehi expressed surprise that there were no women negotiators among the Americans. Sevier was equally astonished that the Cherokee had entrusted such important work to a woman. Nanyehi reportedly told him,

"You know that women are always looked upon as nothing; but we are your mothers; you are our sons. Our cry is all for peace; let it continue. This peace must last forever. Let your women's sons be ours; our sons be yours. Let your women hear our words."

An American observer said that her speech was very moving.

== Changes to Cherokee society ==
In the early 1760s, the Cherokee entered an alliance with the British colonists who were fighting the French and their allies in the French and Indian War (the North American front of the Seven Years' War in Europe). Each side had Native American allies in North America. In exchange for their assistance, the British Americans promised to protect the Cherokee from their enemies: the Creek and Choctaw peoples.

The British built military stations and frontier posts on Cherokee land. These posts gradually attracted more European-American settlers. A group of White frontiersmen killed a group of Cherokee in present-day West Virginia, who were returning from having helped the British take over Fort Duquesne (at present-day Pittsburgh). Outraged, the Cherokee killed more than 20 settlers in retaliation. Conflict broke out that lasted two years, during which the Cherokee captured Fort Loudon on the Tellico River in August 1760.

A decade later, In May 1775, a group of Delaware, Mohawk and Shawnee emissaries formed a delegation that headed south to support the British who were trying to gain the help of the Cherokee and other tribes for war with their rebel colonies.

== Revolutionary War years ==
The Cherokee had to face multiple issues during the Revolutionary War. Most of the tribes were originally allied with the British against the rebel colonists. (Note: The British supported Dragging Canoe's war against the settlers and supplied him with weapons.) They wanted to expel the European-American settlers from their lands. Ward's cousin, the war chief, Dragging Canoe, wanted to ally with the British against the settlers, but Nanyehi wanted to keep peace with the rebels. In early July 1776, Ward warned a group of white settlers living near the Holston River and on the Virginia border about an imminent attack by her people. In late July 1776, Dragging Canoe, Oconostota, and The Raven led a surprise attack on the Overmountain settlements of Heaton's station, Fort Watauga, and Carter's Valley, respectively. After being beaten back by the frontiersmen, Cherokee raiding parties continued attacks against the isolated settlements in the region. State militias retaliated, destroying Native villages and crops. The Carolina Light Horse Rangers and Virginia Royal Scots formed a punitive expedition against Cherokee settlements in Fall of that year, that burnt most of the Overhill Cherokee towns, crops, and winter supplies. Devastated, the Cherokee sought peace in January 1777, and gave up hunting grounds in east Tennessee to the American frontiersmen.

=== Captive rescue ===
In her role as a Beloved Woman, Nancy Ward had the authority to spare captives. Following the Cherokee attacks on the Watauga settlements, she saved settler Lydia (Russell) Bean, the wife of William Bean, at what is present day's Elizabethton, Tennessee. She took Bean into her house and nursed her back to health from her wounds. A recovered Bean taught Nanyehi a new loom-weaving technique, which she then taught other women in the tribe. The Cherokee women had typically made garments by sewing a combination of processed hides, handwoven vegetal fiber cloth, and cotton or wool cloth bought from traders. Women wove all the cloth in the village for tribal members' garments.

Lydia Bean had reclaimed two of her dairy cows from the settlement. While she was living with Nanyehi, she taught the Cherokee woman how to care for the cows, milk them, and process the milk into dairy products. Both the animals and their products would sustain the Cherokee when hunting was bad. Starr wrote that Nancy Ward successfully raised cows and was said to have been the first to introduce that industry among the Cherokees. Those Cherokee who adopted loom weaving and dairy farming began to resemble European-American subsistence farmers. According to a 1933 account, Nanyehi was also among the first Cherokees to own African-American slaves. (Note: Many Cherokee who adopted the practice of chattel slavery tended to be Cherokees in the Deep South, where they were developing cotton plantations.)

=== Cherokee–American War years ===
With the signing of the Treaty of Dewitt's Corner in early 1777, Dragging Canoe, whose lone counsel to continue the war against the frontier settlements had been dismissed, left the area of the traditional Cherokee towns with many like-minded warriors and their families. The group traveled further down the Tennessee River valley, away from the White men. He and about 500 Cherokee settled 11 new tribal towns centered on the convergence of the Tennessee River with South Chickamauga Creek. This band was thereafter known as the Chickamauga (or Lower) Cherokee.

Ward's peace efforts had not prevented another invasion of the Cherokee territory by the North Carolina militia in 1778. The force under Evan Shelby destroyed more villages and demanded further land cessions. Ward and her family were captured in the battle, but they were eventually released and returned to Chota. In 1780, Ward continued to warn Patriot soldiers of attacks, in an effort to prevent further retaliatory raids against her people. According to folklorist, Harold Felton, she even sent cattle to the starving militia. In July 1781, Nanyehi negotiated a peace treaty between her people and the Americans. No longer facing a major Cherokee threat along the western frontier, the Overmountain Men were able to send a considerable amount of man power to support the eastern seaboard militias and Washington's Continental army against British General Cornwallis' forces in the American Revolution.

Ward continued promoting alliance and mutual friendship between the Cherokee and the Americans, helping negotiate the Cherokee Treaty of Hopewell (1785). Nanyehi objected to further sales of Cherokee lands to whites, but her objections were largely ignored. The Cherokee were under pressure in Georgia and Alabama from encroachment by White settlers. Some leaders believed that ceding lands bought them some time and helped preserve the Cherokee people. The Chickamauga, however, continued their relentless fight against frontier settlers up to the 1794 establishment of the Cherokee Nation.

== Later life ==
In 1808 and again in 1817, the Women's Council reportedly spoke out against the cession or sale to the United States of any more lands. In 1817 Nanyehi was too sick to attend the Cherokee council at which leaders discussed whether or not to move west of the Mississippi River to Indian Territory, as was proposed by Georgia and the US federal government. She sent a letter to the council, writing:

"…don't part with any more of our lands but continue on it and enlarge your farms and cultivate and raise corn and cotton and we, your mothers and sisters, will make clothing for you… It was our desire to forewarn you all not to part with our lands."

Despite her efforts, in 1819 the Cherokee ceded their lands north of the Hiwassee River and she was forced to join other Cherokee in moving south.

Nancy Ward opened an inn in southeastern Tennessee at Womankiller Ford, on the Ocowee River (present-day Ocoee River). Her son cared for her during her last years. (Note: On July 5, 1807, the Moravian mission school at Spring Place in the Cherokee Nation (now part of Georgia), was visited by three elderly Cherokee women. One had been widowed for 50 years and was said to be nearly 100 years old. She was described by the Moravians as "an unusually sensible person, honored and loved by both brown and white people." Said to be named Chiconehla, the woman purportedly fought against an enemy nation and was wounded numerous times. The missionaries wrote, "Her left arm is decorated with some designs, which she said were fashionable during her youth...." Chiconehla stayed for two days, entertained by the students, and discussing theology with the missionaries. A relative, Margaret Scott, wife of James Vann (both Cherokee), translated for her. Historian Rowena McClinton believes Chiconehla was the woman also known as Nanye'hi, or Nancy Ward.)

== Death ==
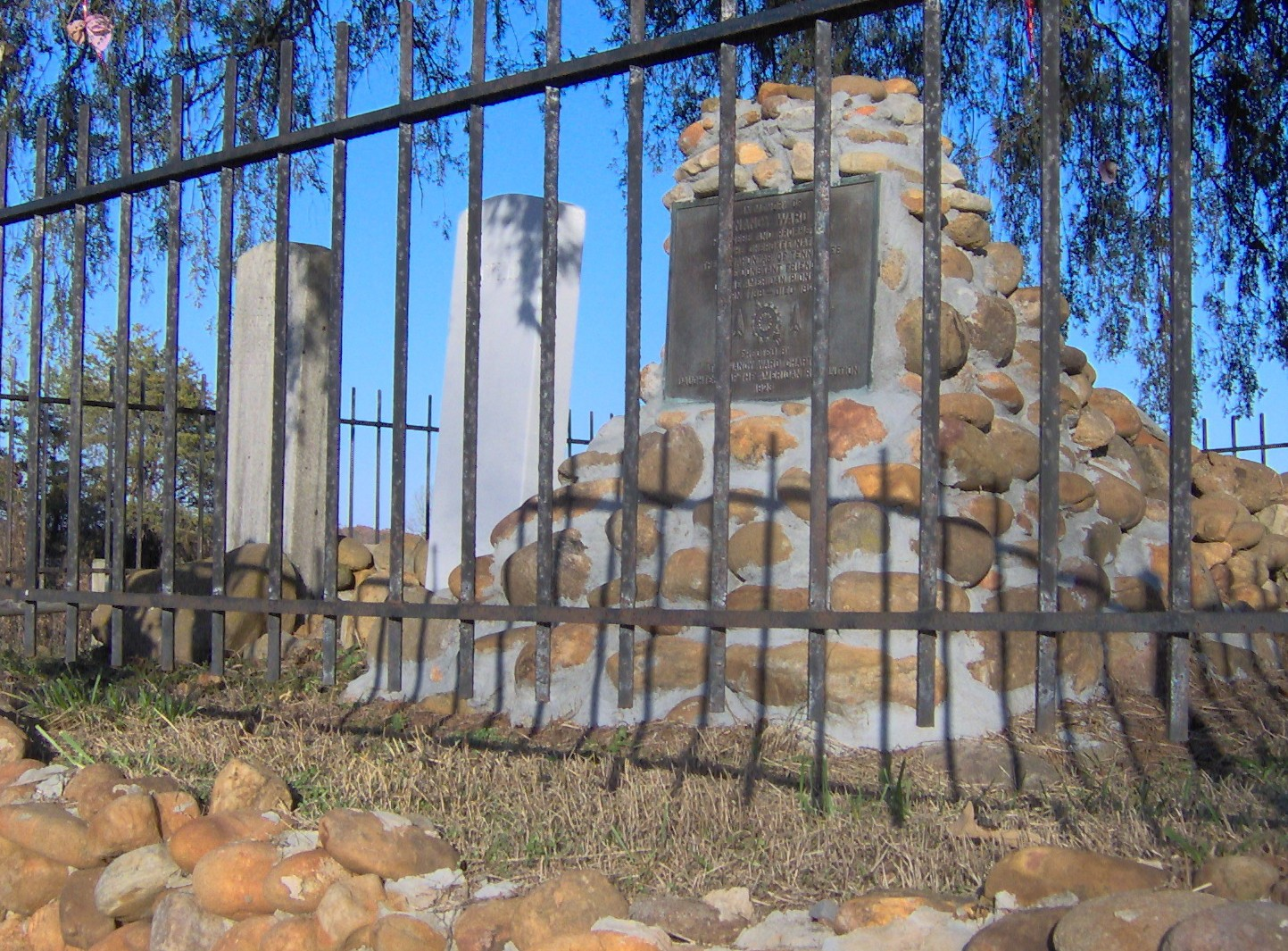
Memorial to Nancy Ward, located near Benton, Tennessee

Ward died 1822 – 1824, before the Cherokee were removed from their remaining lands. She and her son, Fivekiller, are buried at the Nancy Ward Tomb, on top of a hill not far from the site of the inn, south of present-day Benton, Tennessee.

== Legacy ==
- Cherokee oral history tells that in her last years Nanyehi repeatedly had a vision showing a "great line of our people marching on foot. Mothers with babies in their arms. Fathers with small children on their back. Grandmothers and Grandfathers with large bundles on their backs. They were marching West and the 'Unaka' (White Soldiers) were behind them. They left a trail of corpses the weak, the sick who could not survive the journey."
- A chapter of the Daughters of the American Revolution in Tennessee was named after her.
- In 1923 the Nancy Ward chapter of the DAR, based in Chattanooga, Tennessee, placed a memorial marker at the two Ward grave sites in Benton.
- The Polk County Historical and Genealogical Society maintains a Nancy Ward Room in their genealogy library.
- Polk County, Tennessee is trying to raise money to establish a Nancy Ward Museum.
- Nanyehi has been documented in historical papers and accounts. She is noted in the Calendar of Virginia State Papers, the South Carolina State Papers, James Mooney's History, Myths, and Sacred Formulas of the Cherokees, and the Draper Collection.
- Theodore Roosevelt mentions her in his book, The Winning of the West (1905).
- A statue of Nancy Ward, carved by James Abraham Walker around 1906, was sold in 1912. It stood in a cemetery in Grainger County, Tennessee for about 70 years, but was stolen in the early 1980s.
- The 2011 musical Nanyehi: The Story of Nancy Ward is based upon Ward's life. It was written by singer-songwriter Becky Hobbs, who is a 5th-great granddaughter of Ward.
- In 2024, an episode of Finding Your Roots revealed that Cherokee actor Wes Studi is her direct descendant, his sixth great grandmother.
