= Kituwa =

Historic place in North Carolina, United States

- U.S. National Register of Historic Places
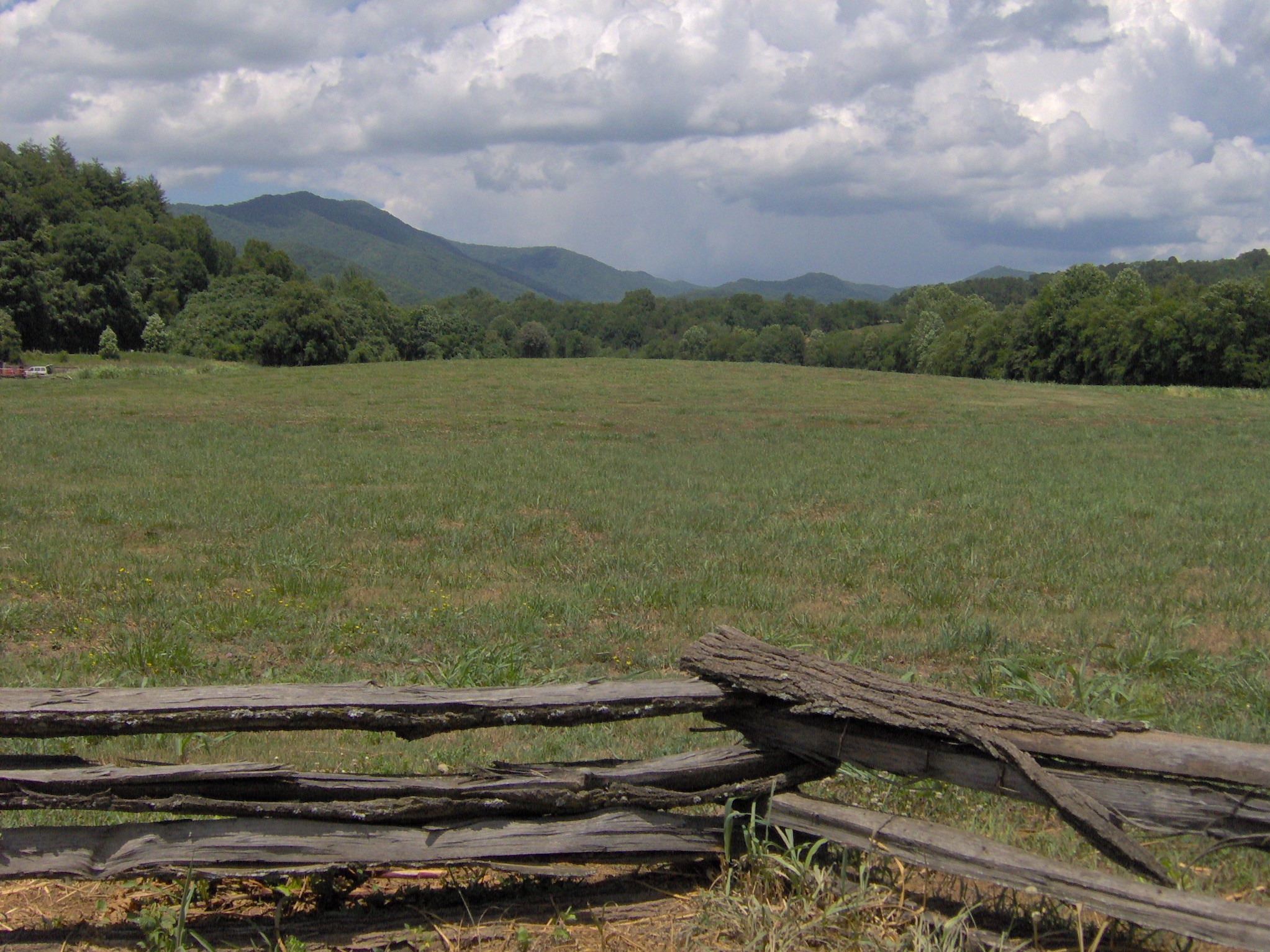
- The Kituwa mound at Ferguson Field

- Location within North Carolina Location within the United States
- Location: U.S. Route 19 east of Bryson City, near Bryson City, North Carolina
- Coordinates: 35.438852°N 83.401138°W
- Area: 20 acres (8.1 ha)
- NRHP reference No.: 73002239
- Added to NRHP: June 4, 2023-11-5

Kituwa (also spelled Kituwah, Keetoowah, Kittowa, Kitara and other similar variations) or giduhwa (Cherokee: ᎩᏚᏩ) is a Woodland period Native American settlement near the upper Tuckasegee River, and is claimed by the Cherokee people as their original town. An earthwork platform mound, built about 1000 CE, marks a ceremonial site here. The historic Cherokee built a townhouse on top that was used for their communal gatherings and decisionmaking; they replaced it repeatedly over decades. They identify Kituwa as one of the "seven mother towns" in their traditional homeland of the American Southeast. This site is in modern Swain County, North Carolina, in the Great Smoky Mountains.

The Cherokee lost control of this site to the United States in the early 19th century. In the late 1830s, most of their people in the Southeast were forcibly removed by US forces to Indian Territory. Descendants of those who remained in North Carolina formed the Eastern Band of Cherokee Indians (EBCI), which is federally recognized.

Kituwa (31Sw2) was added to the National Register of Historic Places in 1973 because of its historic and archeological significance. In 1996 the EBCI purchased 309 acres of land, including Kituwa mound and the former town site. They have conducted archeological surveys that have added to their knowledge about the long history of the site and Cherokee uses, including burials there. As a result, they have decided to leave this sacred site undeveloped.

Since the mid-19th century, the term "Keetoowah" has been associated with Cherokee people, initially full-blood only, who supported a kind of religious nationalism. They adhered to pre-contact communal ways. Conservative descendants of Cherokee who had migrated to Arkansas and Indian Territory in the 1810s and 1820s later formed what is now the federally recognized tribe of the United Keetoowah Band, based in Oklahoma. During the 19th century, after removal to Indian Territory, there were Cherokee groups who identified as Keetoowah, at times forming secret societies that maintained rituals and sacred ceremonies.

== History ==
Kituwa is the site of Woodland period villages and an earthwork platform mound, which was built by about 1000 CE during the period of the South Appalachian Mississippian culture. The Cherokee hold the site sacred as the original town of their people. It is along the Tuckaseegee River, before its confluence with the Oconaluftee River.

For peoples of several Woodland and Mississippian cultures, building such earthwork mounds was characteristic of their societies and an expression of public architecture that was part of their cosmology and political system. Remains of such platform mounds and effigy mounds are evident throughout the Mississippi Basin and Ohio Valley. The areas of moundbuilding by various cultures included Tennessee to the west, Georgia to the southeast, Louisiana to the southwest, and Ohio, Indiana, Illinois, and Missouri to the northwest.

The South Appalachian Mississippian culture, a regional variation of the classic Mississippian culture, is documented as established in what is now known as Western North Carolina from 1000 CE. Mississippian-culture sites have been identified extending southwest in the river valleys, including the town later called Kituwa by the Cherokee, where the ancient platform mound is still visible. The Mississippian-culture peoples were part of vast, indigenous trade networks that connected chiefdoms throughout the present-day eastern United States, spanning the continent from the Gulf Coast to the Great Lakes. In contrast to some of the larger settlements in the Midwest, which had large complexes of multiple mounds, in North Carolina most of the major towns had a single platform mound. Smaller villages developed near what the Cherokee called the "mother towns".

=== Historic Cherokee ===
Archaeologists believe the people of the smaller chiefdoms were eventually absorbed by the developing, larger Catawba and Cherokee tribes of this region. These have been documented since the historic period.

Cherokee public architecture took the form of building townhouses, also known as council houses, on top of the platform mounds. Where no mound existed, they built the townhouse at a central plaza in the town. It was the place for community gathering and creation of consensus for communal decisionmaking.

At the time of European encounter, the Cherokee regularly burned the vegetation on the mound for agricultural use. It may also have been part of ritual to preserve the mound, to keep it visible and free of trees. Burning underbrush was part of sustainable farming practices.

After European Americans forced the removal of the Cherokee Nation in the 1830s from the Southeast, they took over their lands. At Kituwah, they repeatedly plowed the mound and village area for corn cultivation. The mound is still visible although much shorter than it would have been during the Cherokee time. By the end of the period of European-American ownership, the mound was within the boundaries of a private property called Ferguson's Field.

In the 21st century, the remaining Kituwah mound is 170 feet (52 m) in diameter and five feet tall, although archeologists know that it was once taller. According to Cherokee oral tradition, they had built a townhouse structure on top that housed their sacred flame, which was to be kept burning at all times.

The inhabitants of Kituwah, known as the Ani-kitu-hwagi, influenced all of the Cherokee towns of the heartland along the Tuckasegee and Oconaluftee rivers (which were known as the Out Towns, in a geographic grouping). The people also influenced the Middle Towns, those Cherokee towns along the upper Little Tennessee River and its tributaries. The Valley Towns were further south in this area, along the upper Hiwassee, Nantahala, and Valley rivers; all of these were located in what later became the province and state of North Carolina.

The people of this region became known as the Kituwah, also spelled Keetoowah, after the name of their mother town. Because the Kituwah were seen to protect the northern border of the Cherokee from Iroquois nations raiding from New York and various Algonquian peoples, gradually Kituwah also became synonymous with Cherokee.

During the colonial period, the Cherokee towns along the Savannah River (also known as the Keowee River in their territory) and its tributaries were known by English colonists as the Lower Towns. The colonists referred to the towns in eastern Tennessee as the Overhill Towns, as their traders had to cross the Appalachian Mountains to reach them. They were located along the lower Little Tennessee River and upper Tennessee River, as well as the Tellico River and lower Hiwassee River.

The Cherokee language is of Iroquoian origin, and most tribes of this language family have historically been based around the Great Lakes in North America. The Cherokee and other southern Iroquoian-speaking tribes, such as the Tuscarora in North Carolina, and Meherrin and Nottoway in Virginia, are believed to have migrated long ago to the South from the Great Lakes area. According to James Mooney's study and compilation of Cherokee myth, published after living with the people, such migration is recounted in Cherokee oral history. The Cherokee settled in the territory of what is now western Virginia, western South and North Carolina, southeastern Tennessee, and northeastern Georgia, which they consider their homelands.

In the 21st century, the ancient site of the Mother Town Kituwah is visible in the general area of the Qualla Boundary. The federally recognized Eastern Band of Cherokee (ECBI), based in North Carolina, re-acquired Kituwah and an associated 309 acres (1.25 km^{2}) in 1996, taking it back under Cherokee control.(see below "reclamation")

== Colonial and early federal period ==
During the Anglo-Cherokee War (1758–1761), British forces under general James Grant destroyed the town of Kituwa during the Cherokee-Anglo War, which was caused by the settlers of Virginia killing several Cherokee auxiliaries and selling their scalps. (The Cherokee-Anglo War began in late 1759 after approximately four years of increased hostilities due to British failure to meet treaty terms, settler encroachment, and shortages of pay to Cherokee auxiliaries who had fought in the Forbes expedition against Fort Duquesne.)

Kituwa's survivors migrated westward across the Appalachian Mountains, settling in Mialoquo (Great Island Town) on the lower Little Tennessee River among the Overhill Cherokee. A later headman of this group was Dragging Canoe, son of Attakullakulla. During and after the American Revolutionary War, when he led his warriors southwest to continue fighting the colonists of Upper East Tennessee, the entire population went with him, including those formerly of Kituwa.

By 1819 the Cherokee lost control of the Kituwa area after being forced to make treaties and land cessions in this area to the United States. In the late 1830s most Cherokee in the Southeast were forcibly removed by the federal government, walking overland on the Trail of Tears to Indian Territory. Descendants of those who remained in this area later organized and were federally recognized in 1868 as the Eastern Band of Cherokee, based in Western North Carolina. They are the only federally recognized tribe in the state, and one of three Cherokee tribes. The other two are in what is now the state of Oklahoma.

=== 20th-century reclamation ===
In 1996 the Eastern Band of Cherokee purchased the Kituwah mound and village site, a total of 309 acres (1.25 km^{2}). Their 1997 archaeological survey of Kituwah revealed thousands of artifacts, evidence of thousands of years of human habitation at this site. Among the evidence of settlement was an early 18th-century Cherokee town, which occupied 65 acres (260,000 m^{2}).

The Cherokee have debated how to use the land. Initially some EBCI members wanted to develop the property for community uses. Since then they have had additional, non-invasive archaeological surveys conducted by use of a gradiometer. These revealed 15 burials. There is a likelihood of up to 1000 burials, as it was the Cherokee custom for people to be buried in the village where they lived. This survey also revealed the location of many hearth sites, including one at the center of the town. This would likely have been associated with the sacred fire of the townhouse on the mound.

Based on these discoveries, more Cherokee citizens believe that the sacred nature of the site requires that it be left undisturbed. They are planning uses associated with community wellness and renewal. The Eastern Cherokee have sponsored two youth retreats at the site, which highlighted traditional ways of spiritual expression.

In 2021, Kituwah was successfully placed into trust for the EBCI, becoming sovereign territory through an agreement signed by Principal Chief Richard Sneed. Sneed made a statement afterward, noting that “Taking this land into trust will ensure this most sacred site will be preserved and honored in perpetuity. This land will never again be taken from our people.”

=== Duke Energy controversy in 2010 ===
In the early 21st century, Duke Energy announced plans to build a $52 million substation near the Kituwah mound. Both Swain County and the Eastern Cherokee opposed this project; the county asked for a moratorium on such projects until it could consider zoning ordinances to regulate them. But the state Utilities Commission has the power to override local ordinances in order to achieve its mission of supplying electricity at reasonable rates.

On February 4, 2010, the Eastern Cherokee Tribal Council passed a resolution opposing the project, stating,

It is this Tribe's solemn responsibility and moral duty to care for and protect all of Kituwah from further desecration and degradation by human agency in order to preserve the integrity of the most important site for the origination and continuation of Cherokee culture, heritage, history and identity.

In March 2010, Swain County passed a resolution calling for a 90-day moratorium to stop construction of Duke Energy's project until they could better consult. On April 23, 2010, the North Carolina Utilities Commission denied Duke Energy's "Motion to Hold Complaint in Abeyance." It directed Duke to file an answer to the complaint on or before May 10, 2010. Duke agreed to halt the construction that threatened Kituwah for 90 days until the complaint was heard.

In July 2010 the Swain County commission passed an ordinance requiring Duke Energy to consult with local stakeholders about projects, which they had not originally done in this case. In August 2010, after continued consultation, Duke agreed to move the proposed Hyatt Creek tie station away from sight of the Kituwa mound. The Cherokee tribes and leaders of Swain County praised Duke Energy for their consultation on this project and this outcome.

== Traditions ==
Cherokee oral traditions say that all Cherokee settled in Kituwa after the migration from the Great Lakes region of the United States and southern Canada as early as 4,000 years ago. Cultural and archaeological evidence support the people's accounts of their migration, but there is no scholarly consensus about when they reached the Southeast and formed the culture recognized as Cherokee.

The ancient Cherokee had a hereditary priesthood, called the Ah-ni-ku-ta-ni, a structure that may have been adopted from another tribe. According to research by early 20th-century ethnographer James Mooney, the Cherokee held the Ah-ni-ku-ta-ni "in awe" and "greatly feared them." They were not the regular chiefs. These were of two types, known as the uguku (owls), or "white" chiefs (sometimes identified as those who worked for peace or during times of peace), and the kolona (ravens), or "red" chiefs (identified as those who led in times of war.)

Some traditional Cherokee identify by the autonym of Ah-ni-ki-tu-wa-gi (spelled variously in local Oklahoma dialects as Ki-tu-wa or Gi-du-wa), meaning Kituwa people. The meaning of the word Kituwa is known to contemporary Cherokee speakers. It is not widely reported because of its sacred nature. Other known etymologies for Kituwah stem from "Ga-Du-Hv," which is the word for a town which is derived from the root "Ga-du" meaning "to gather," with a past tense locative suffix indicating "Place Where They Were Gathered." The name is in reference to its role as one of the mother towns of the Cherokee Nation.

Honoring the "mother town" was analogous to honoring Selu, the Cherokee Corn Mother (of the ancient Green Corn Ceremony and many other connections). Honoring mothers is a concept that is pervasive in Cherokee culture. Well into the 20th century, the Cherokee had a matrilineal kinship system, by which clan membership, inheritance and status were carried by the mother's family. A child was considered born into its mother's family and clan.

In the Green Corn Ceremony, one of the two social dances performed is of ancient origin. It may have been practiced in the mother town of Kituwa. The dance is called ye-lu-le, which means "to the center". During it, all of the dancers shout ye-lu-le and move toward the fire in the center of the dance circle. This dance symbolizes the dispersal of the sacred fire given to the people, according to their ancient legends. During Green Corn ceremonies in traditional Cherokee society, the coals of new fire were carried to all the Cherokee. They were used to kindle the ceremonial fires in each town before any of the new corn could be eaten. The home fires in outlying Cherokee communities were extinguished before the ceremonies and relit from the coals of the fire kindled during the Green Corn Dances.

== See also ==
- New Kituwah Academy
