= Conasauga, Georgia =

Extinct town in Gilmer County, Georgia, US

Coordinates: 34°46′56″N 84°35′29″W

Conasauga is an extinct town in Gilmer County, in the U.S. state of Georgia.

== History ==
Conasauga is the site of a former historic Cherokee settlement. "Conasauga" is a name derived from the Cherokee language meaning "grass". Variant names are "Connasauga", "Connesauga", "Connesawga", and "Cunasagee".

European Americans replaced them in this area after removal. They established a post office called "Connesauga" in 1880, and it operated until 1909. The people abandoned the community, moving to larger towns.
