= Cherokee clans =

Cherokee traditional social organizations

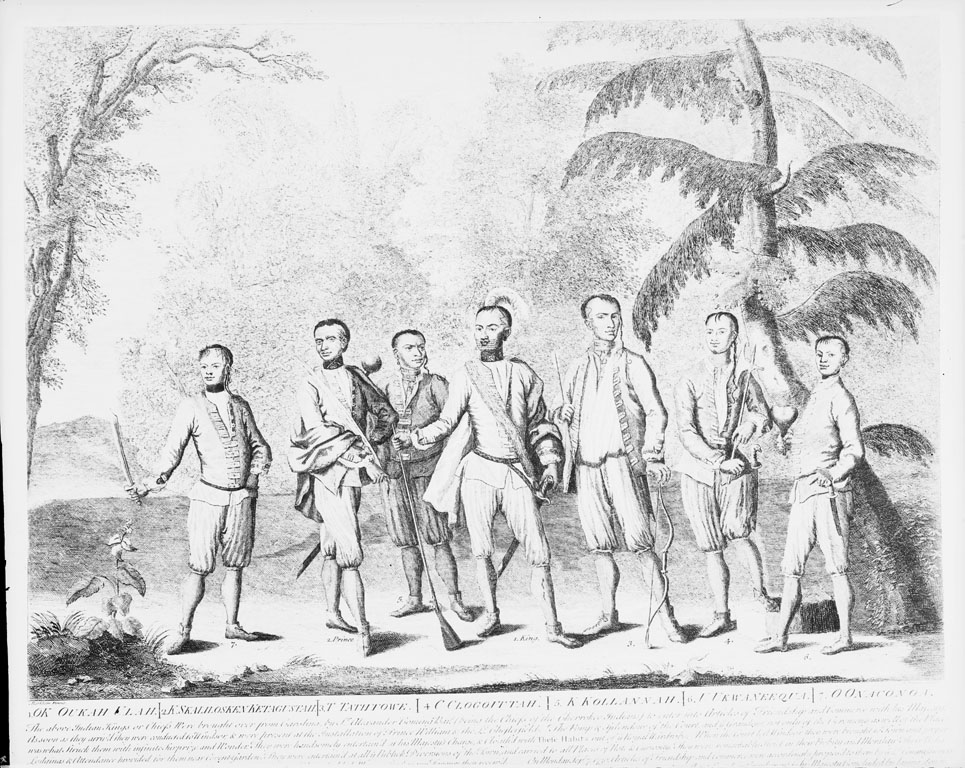
Seven Cherokee chiefs who accompanied Sir Alexander Cumming, to England, representing every region in which the Cherokee then lived.

The Cherokee clans (Cherokee syllabary:ᏣᎳᎩ ᏓᏂᎳᏍᏓᏢᎢ) are traditional social organizations of Cherokee society.

== Customs and functions of the Cherokee clans ==
The Cherokee society was historically a matrilineal society; meaning children belong to the mother's clan, and hereditary leadership and property were passed through the maternal line. Traditionally, women were considered the head of household among the Cherokee, with the home and children belonging to her should she separate from a husband, and maternal uncles were considered more important than fathers. Property was inherited and bequeathed through the clan and held in common by it. In addition, Cherokee society tended to be matrilocal, meaning that once married a couple moved in with or near the bride's family.

Cherokee clans held the only coercive power within Cherokee society. It was forbidden to marry within one's clan or to someone in the clan of one's father. Such marriage was considered incest and punishable by death at the hands of the offender's own clan and by no other. The clan was also responsible for balancing the death of one of its members at the hands of the member of another clan, whether deliberate, impulsive, or accidental. The one to pay the penalty did not have to be the person responsible; it could be any member of his or her clan. Indeed, if the intentional or unintentional killer escaped or found sanctuary in one of the towns so designated, such as Chota, Kituwa, or Tugaloo, the fugitive's clan was expected to deliver up another of its members. The purpose of this was not retaliation but equalization.

Cherokee born outside of a clan or outsiders who were taken into the tribe in ancient times had to be adopted into a clan by a clan mother. If the person was a woman who had born a Cherokee child and was married to a Cherokee man, she could be taken into a new clan. Her husband was required to leave his clan and live with her in her new clan. Men who were not Cherokee and married into a Cherokee household had to be adopted into a clan by a clan mother; he could not take his wife's clan.

In "The Cherokee Editor" on February 18, 1829, Elias Boudinot wrote the following regarding Cherokee Clan marriage customs:

This simple division of the Cherokees formed the grand work by which marriages were regulated, and murder punished. A Cherokee could marry into any of the clans except two, that to which his father belongs, for all of that clan are his fathers and aunts and that to which his mother belongs, for all of that clan are his brothers and sisters, a child invariably inheriting the clan of his mother.

In a practice known as Gadugi, Cherokee clans took care of orphans, those left destitute by various circumstances and fostered hospitality for visiting clan members from other villages. This communal work provided an important function to the overall village and community as a whole.

== The seven clans ==
The Cherokee have seven clans, and have had that number as long as there has been contact with Europeans. Some have multiple names, and according to ethnographer James Mooney the seven are the result of consolidation of possibly fourteen separate clans in more ancient times.

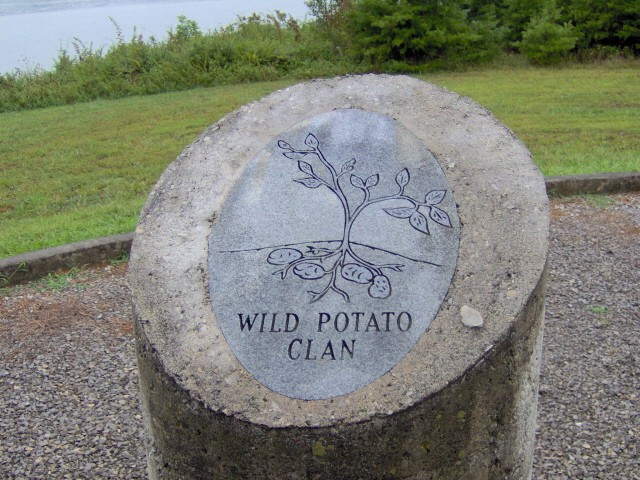
Wild Potato Clan pillar from the monument at Chota.

=== Anigatogewi ===
"Anigatogewi" or "Anigadogewi" (Cherokee syllabary: ᎠᏂᎦᏙᎨᏫ) cannot confidently be translated; however, this clan is known as the "Wild Potato Clan", or occasionally as the "Blind Savannah Clan".

The Anigatogewi's only subdivision was Blind Savannah, which may have originally been a separate clan. Historically, members of this clan were known to be 'keepers of the land,' and gatherers. The wild potato was a main staple of the traditional Cherokee life in the Southeast (Tsalagi Uweti).

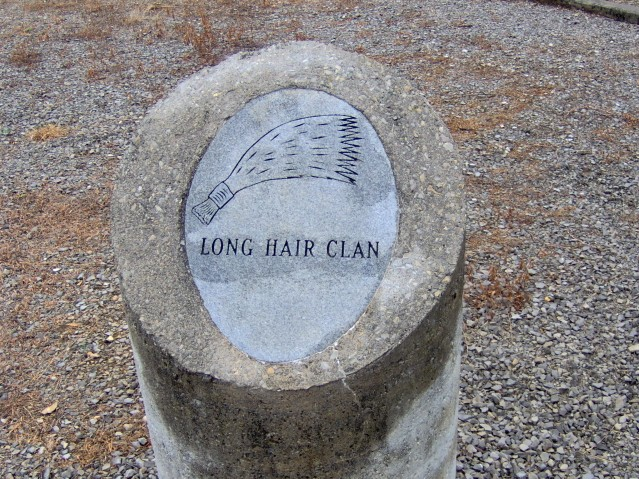
Long Hair Clan pillar from the monument at Chota

=== Anigilohi ===
"Anigilohi" (Cherokee syllabary: ᎠᏂᎩᎶᎯ) is translated as "Long Hairs" or "Twisters." The name can be translated as "They have just become offended" or it may be a shorter form of Gitlugunahita, which literally means "Long Hair".

The Anigilahi or the Long Hair Clan, whose subdivisions were Twister, Wind, and Strangers (which were possibly separate clans), were regarded as peacemakers. Peace Chiefs would often be from this clan. In the times of the Peace Chief and War Chief government, the Peace Chief would come from this clan. Prisoners of war, orphans of other tribes, and others with no Cherokee tribe were often adopted into this clan, thus a common interpretation of the name 'Strangers.'

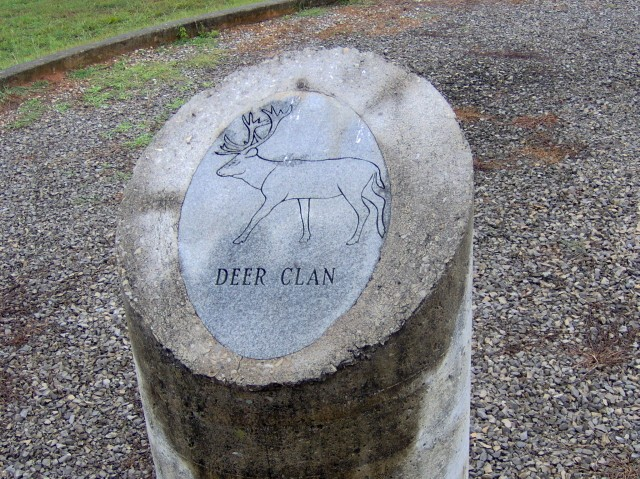
Deer Clan pillar from the monument at Chota

=== Aniawi ===
"Aniawi" (Cherokee syllabary: ᎠᏂᎠᏫ) is the "Deer Clan." The Aniawi, or Deer Clan, were historically known as fast runners and hunters. Even though they hunted game for subsistence, they respected and cared for the animals while they were living among them. They were also known as messengers on an earthly level, delivering messages from village to village, or person to person.

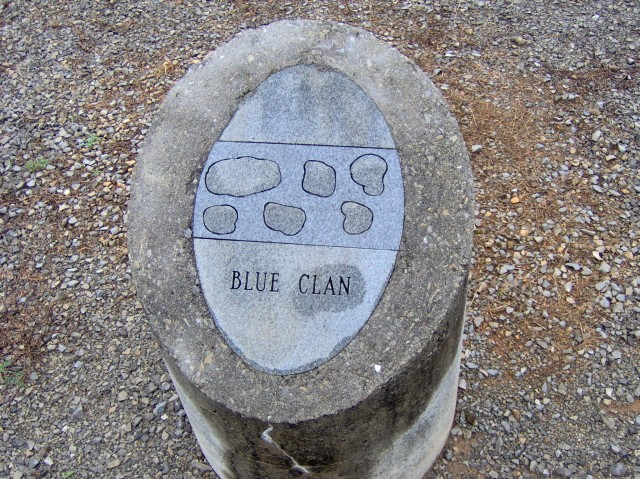
Blue Clan pillar from the monument at Chota

=== Anisahoni ===
"Anisahoni" (Cherokee syllabary: ᎠᏂᏌᎰᏂ) is the "Blue Clan". The Anisahoni, or Blue Holly Clan, subdivisions were Panther/Wildcat and Bear, probably in origin two separate clans that were later consolidated with a third. Historically, this clan produced many people who were able to make special medicines for the children. The medicine was made from a blue plant which is where the clan gained its name.

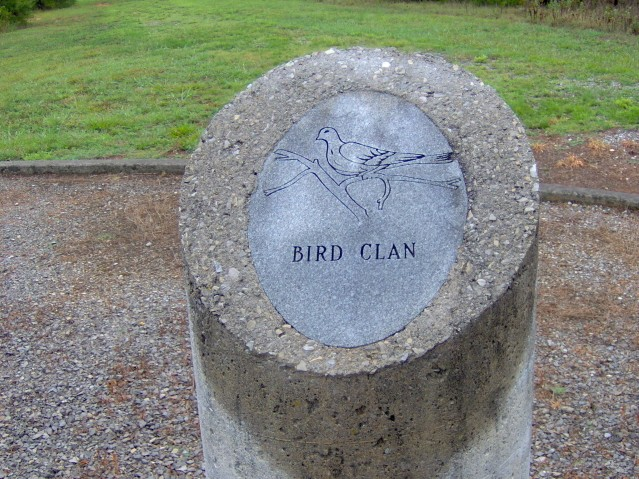
Bird Clan pillar from the monument at Chota

=== Anitsiskwa ===
"Anitsiskwa" or "Anitsisqua" (Cherokee syllabary: ᎠᏂᏥᏍᏆ) is the "Bird Clan". The subdivisions of Raven, Turtledove, and Eagle were probably three separate clans later consolidated into one. Members of the Bird Clan were historically known as messengers. The belief that birds are messengers between earth and heaven, or the People and Creator, gave the members of this clan the responsibility of caring for the birds. Earned Eagle feathers were originally presented by the members of this clan, as they were the only ones able to collect them.

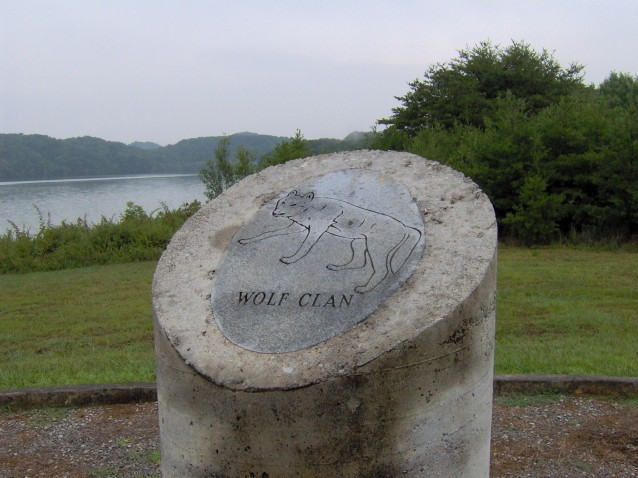
Wolf Clan pillar from the monument at Chota

=== Aniwaya ===
"Aniwaya" or "Aniwahya" (Cherokee syllabary: ᎠᏂᏩᏯ) is the "Wolf Clan". The Aniwaya, or Wolf Clan, has been known throughout time to be the largest clan. During the time of the Peace Chief and War Chief government setting, the War Chief would come from this clan. Wolves are known as protectors. Historically, the Wolf Clan was the largest among the Cherokee.

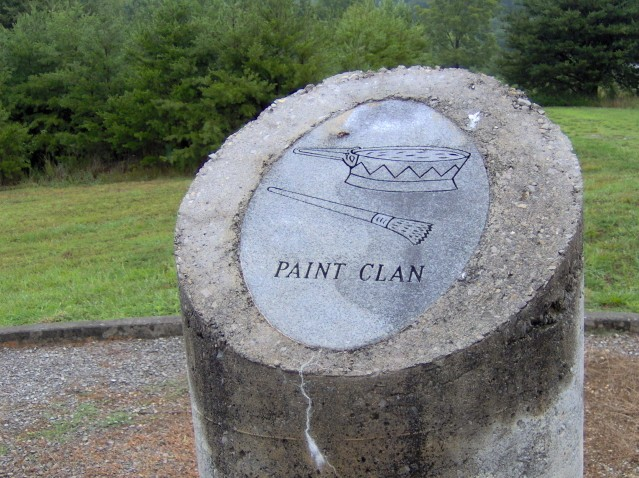
Paint Clan pillar from the monument at Chota

=== Aniwodi ===
"Aniwodi" (Cherokee syllabary: ᎠᏂᏬᏗ) is the "Paint Clan", also commonly called the "Red Paint Clan". The Aniwodi or the Paint Clan were historically known as a prominent medicine people. Medicine is often 'painted' on a patient after harvesting, mixing and performing other aspects of the ceremony.

== Historical evolution of the clan system in the 19th century ==
Although traditionalists still observe clan customs regarding marriage and certain social event, the customs and mores of the Cherokee regarding clans and the clan system have evolved considerably since ancient times, especially beginning with the 19th century.

A large reason for this was the turmoil of the Cherokee–American wars and the resulting displacement of vast numbers of Cherokee removed westward, both voluntarily and involuntarily, from their more easterly ancient homes. Also, European traders in the Southeast—mostly Scottish, but also English, Irish, German, even French—had married Cherokee women (as well as those of other tribes) for several decades. Their children belonged to the mother and her clan and were considered Cherokee.

The first change legislated by the National Council of the Cherokee Nation actually took place a few years before the beginning of the 19th century, when in 1797 it ruled that clans no longer had to redress deaths that were judged to be accidental, and also abolished the practice of substituting one clan member for another to answer for the death of a person from another clan if the person so culpable could not be obtained. The Ridge, who had joined the Council as the representative from Pine Log town, the previous year, initiated these changes.

The Ridge also helped bring about the second major revision to the Cherokee "Blood Law", which was provoked largely by the assassination of Doublehead at the Hiwassee Garrison near the Cherokee Agency (now Calhoun, Tennessee) in August 1807. The stated reason was Doublehead's involvement in making private deals to sell off Cherokee land. The killers were Ridge and Alexander Sanders, the two of them having to stand in for James Vann, who was too drunk to accomplish the task.

Much more wide-sweeping changes came with the first printed law in the Cherokee Nation, passed by the National Council on September 11, 1808. A major reform designed and pushed forward by the young chiefs' "Cherokee Triumvirate" (James Vann, Charles R. Hicks, and The Ridge), its primary prescriptive feature was setting up a Light Horse Guard of several teams over the whole Nation to act as "regulating parties", and also provided for a system of patrilineal inheritance alongside the matrilineal inheritance system of the clans. Major Ridge served as the first commander of the Light Horse Guard. Proscriptively, it further restricted clan retaliation.

In the Act of Oblivion on April 18, 1810, the National Council completely eradicated clan retaliation from Cherokee law, repudiated matrilineal inheritance, and referred to husbands/fathers in the Nation as the heads of household.

In 1825 the Cherokee Council passed a law admitting children of mixed marriages, in which the father was Cherokee and the mother was white, to the tribe as if their mother were Cherokee.
