= Ani-kutani =

Ancient priesthood of the Cherokee people

The Ani-kutani (ᎠᏂᎫᏔᏂ) (Note: /ɑːˈniːkuːˈtɑːniː/) were an ancient priesthood among the Cherokee people. According to Cherokee legend, the Ani-Kutani were slain during a mass uprising by the Cherokee, approximately 300 years prior to European contact. One legend says that this uprising was sparked by accusations that the Ani-Kutani had become corrupt and were engaging in sexual improprieties.

The Ani-Kutani might be connected to the Longhair Clan, or Anigilohi (ᎠᏂᎩᎶᎯ), or "fire priests" that existed in historic times. They were either a clerical class and/or a hereditary clan. "Aní-" is a prefix referring to a group of individuals.

== James Mooney's writings concerning the Ani-Kutani ==
From the writings of James Mooney, Myths of the Cherokee, section 108 "The Massacre of the Ani'-Kuta'ni. "Among other perishing traditions is that relating to the Ani'Kuta'ni or Ani'Kwata'ni, concerning whom the modern Cherokee know so little that their very identity is now a matter of dispute, a few holding that they were an ancient people who preceded the Cherokee and built the mounds, while others, with more authority, claim that they were a clan or society in the tribe and were destroyed long ago by pestilence or other calamity."

The Ani'Kuta'ni most likely supervised religious ceremonies among the Cherokee. They may have been moundbuilders who lived in the Appalachian lands in which Cherokees settled.

Mooney's informants described this group as much despised, corrupt abusers of their religious power. Mooney stated they were so completely wiped out that even at the mention of them by Principal Chief John Ross and Dr J. B. Evans in 1866, the story and legend were stated to be a century old and must have (due to the dimness of detail) been even older than a century even then.

"The people long brooded in silence over the oppressions and outrages of this high caste, whom they deeply hated but greatly feared. At length a daring young man, a member of an influential family, organized a conspiracy among the people for the massacre of the priesthood. The immediate provocation was the abduction of the wife of the young leader of the conspiracy. His wife was remarkable for her beauty, and was forcibly abducted and violated by one of the Nicotani while he was absent on the chase. On his return he found no difficulty in exciting in others the resentment which he himself experienced. So many had suffered in the same way, so many feared that they might be made to suffer, that nothing was wanted but a leader. A leader appearing in the person of the young brave whom we have named, the people rose under his direction and killed every Nicotani (Ni-go-ta-ni), young and old. Thus perished a hereditary secret society, since which time no hereditary privileges have been tolerated among the Cherokee" (Mooney, p. 393).

== See also ==
- Abenaki mythology
- Cherokee spiritual beliefs
- Midewiwin
- Wabunowin

== Sources ==
- Mooney, James. Myths of the Cherokee and Sacred Formulas of the Cherokee. (Nashville: Charles and Randy Elder-Booksellers, 1982).
- Allen, Paula Gunn : Off the Reservation : Reflections on Boundary-Busting Border-Crossing Loose Canons. Beacon Press, 1999.
