= Cherokee society =

Indigenous American cultural structure and activity

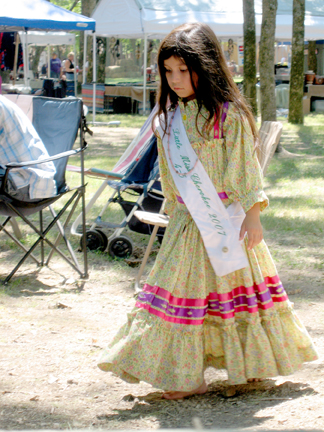
Little Miss Cherokee 2007, Park Hill, Oklahoma

Cherokee society is the culture and societal structures shared by the Cherokee people. The Cherokee people are Indigenous to the mountain and inland regions of the southeastern United States in the areas of present-day North Carolina, and historically in South Carolina, Tennessee, Virginia, and Northern Mountainous areas, now called the Blue Ridge Mountains of Georgia and its lowlands. The majority of the tribe was forcibly removed to Indian Territory (now Oklahoma) in the winter of 1838–1839.

The three federally recognized Cherokee tribes are: the Cherokee Nation (CN); the United Keetoowah Band of Cherokee Indians (UKB); and the Eastern Band of Cherokee Indians (EBCI), consisting of the Cherokees who remained in North Carolina after the Trail of Tears.

== The three Tribes ==
The Eastern Band of Cherokee Indians headquarters are in the town of Cherokee, North Carolina, on the Qualla Boundary, while the Cherokee Nation and the United Keetoowah Band are both headquartered in Tahlequah, Oklahoma. The Cherokee Nation's citizens are primarily descended from the Cherokees who were forced west on the Trail of Tears during the winter of 1838–1839, while the UKB professes its membership is principally descendants of the Cherokee Old Settlers, who moved west prior to 1838. According to local legend, after the Cherokee people reached this area on the Trail of Tears, three tribal elders had scheduled a rendezvous near present-day Tahlequah in order to select a site to settle and use as the seat of tribal government. Two elders arrived and waited for the third. After waiting until dusk, they decided "two is enough" (Ta'ligwu). In Cherokee language, "Ta'li" represents the number two and "-gwu" means "it's enough", or translated as "Two is enough". This legend purportedly began in the 1930s. A more likely origin is the ancient eastern Cherokee town of Great Tellico, spelled Talikwa in Cherokee. Still others trace it to the word tel-i-quah, which is interpreted as "plains". But there is no specific word for "plains" in any current Cherokee lexicon.

== Seven Cherokee Clans ==
Cherokee society has traditionally been grouped around a social organization of seven clans. These are:

- Blue (also Panther or Wild Cat) Clan (Cherokee: ᎠᏂᏌᎰᏂ, romanized: anisahoni)
- Long Hair (also Twister, Hair Hanging Down, or Wind) Clan (Cherokee: ᎠᏂᎩᎶᎯ, romanized: ahnigilohi), wore their hair in elaborate hairdos, walked in a proud and vain manner twisting their shoulders. The Peace Chief was usually from this clan.
- Bird Clan (Cherokee: ᎠᏂᏥᏍᏆ, romanized: anitsisqua)
- Paint Clan (Cherokee: ᎠᏂᏬᏗ, romanized: aniwodi), made red paint
- Deer Clan (Cherokee: ᎠᏂᎠᏫ, romanized: aniawi), were known as fast runners and hunters.
- Wild Potato (also Bear, Raccoon, or Blind Savannah) Clan (Cherokee: ᎠᏂᎦᏙᎨᏫ, romanized: anigadogewi), gathered the wild potato for food from swamps along streams.
- Wolf Clan (Cherokee: ᎠᏂᏩᏯ, romanized: aniwaya), was the largest and most prominent clan, providing most of the tribe's war chiefs.

== Governmental structure ==
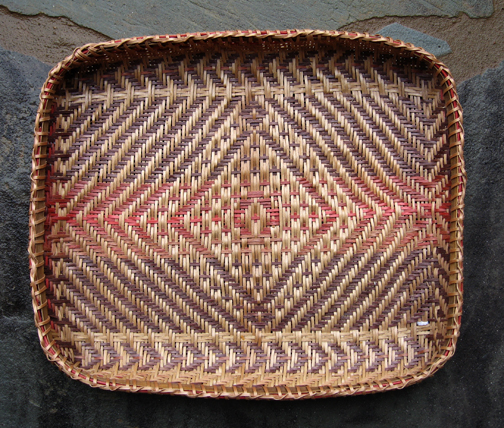
Rivercane basket with Noon-day Sun pattern, by Peggy Brennan (Cherokee Nation)

Each Cherokee town had two governmental units: a white and red government. The white government was in power primarily beginning with spring planting season and maintained control over domestic affairs. There is evidence indicating that both men and women filled the role of chief. In the fall, which was considered the time of war, duties then generally fell on the red government.

=== White government ===
The white government consisted of the Peace Chief, an advisor, prime counselors (one from each clan unit), a council of elders, a chief speaker, messengers, and ceremonial officers. This organization made the decisions that guided the tribe during their times of peace, including domestic issues and ceremonies.

=== Red government ===
The red government consisted of a Great War Chief, the Great War Chief's Second, seven War Counselors, a War Woman or "Beloved Woman", the Chief War Speaker, Messengers, Ceremonial Officers, and War Scouts. The seven war counselors were in charge of declaring war when they felt the circumstances made it necessary. The War Woman and Grandmother Elders would declare the fate of captives and prisoners taken in times of war.

=== Council House ===
Cherokee towns had a large meeting house called a Council House or gatuyi (ᎦᏚᏱ). The Council House was the center of government for each town; it had seven sides, which provided the same number of sections, so that each clan had a place for its representatives within the governmental structure. The seven sections of seats surrounded the sacred fire. Weddings and other meetings were also held within the Council House.

== Family ==
Cherokees are traditionally a matrilineal kinship society, in which property and social status have historically descended through the women's line. To traditional Cherokees, a child is considered born into their mother's family and clan; the most important man in the life of these children is their mother's eldest brother.

== Blood law ==
The blood law system of justice was usually carried out by the oldest brother of the victim, or by an older male relative from the victim's clan.

In 1808 the people created the Lighthorsemen as the chief law enforcement of the Nation, until they were reformed in 1817. By 1825 the Lighthorseman were replaced by Marshals, Sheriffs and Constables to respond to a demand for more structured law enforcement along the European-American model.

== Ceremonies ==
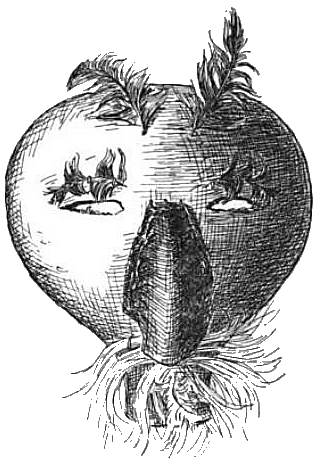
A booger mask made of gourd.

There are seven primary ceremonies traditionally celebrated by Cherokees, but smaller subsequent ceremonies and or extension of primary ceremonies are also practiced. They are as follows:

- New Moon Festival (First Festival),
- Green Corn Ceremony (Second Festival),
- Ripe Corn Ceremony (Third Festival),
- Great New Moon Ceremony (Fourth Festival),
- Friends Made Ceremony (Fifth Festival also known as Propitiation Festival),
- Bounding Bush Ceremony (Sixth Festival)
- and the Uku or Ookah Dance (performed every seven years).

=== Dances ===
Traditional Cherokees have both social and ceremonial dances. Some surviving dances may now be held for different purposes than they had historically. As with many cultures, the Cherokee people have also been influenced by neighboring cultures. Cherokee dances included the Booger Dance, Stomp Dance, War Dance, a victory dance called the Eagle Tail Dance, Ant Dance, Bear Dance, Beaver Hunting Dance, Friendship Dance, Forest Buffalo Dance and Uke Dance.

== See also ==
- Cherokee spiritual beliefs
- Unto These Hills
- Ani-kutani
- Wild onion festival
