= Cherokee Southwest Township (Albuquerque, New Mexico) =

Township in Albuquerque, New Mexico, US

The Cherokee Southwest Township (CSWT) in Albuquerque, New Mexico, is a large group of Cherokee families enrolled with the Cherokee Nation of Oklahoma. It is not a so-called Cherokee heritage group, but a satellite of the main tribal jurisdiction.

All of the township members originated in Eastern Oklahoma and migrated to New Mexico and are citizens of either the Cherokee Nation or United Keetoowah Band of Cherokee Indians. The township incorporated under the Cherokee Nation as a Cherokee Township for Cherokee Nation citizens who migrated to New Mexico during the Oklahoma Dust Bowl in the 1930s (the same migration wave that Cherokee migrant Florence Owens Thompson was part of).

The township has monthly meetings and hosts Cherokee language and history classes. The Albuquerque Cherokee Township has a significant number of native Cherokee speakers. Former principal chief Chad "Corntassel" Smith visited the township four times per year.

== See also ==
- Cherokee heritage groups
  - Cherokees in Texas
  - Cherokees in Mexico
  - Northern Cherokee of the Great Plains (the historic Louisiana Territory)
