= Cherokee Nation of Mexico =

Flag of the Cherokee Nation of Mexico

The Cherokee Nation of Mexico, also known as the Cherokee Nation of Sequoyah of Mexico, Texas, and U.S.A. Reservation and Church, is an organization of individuals who claim descent from Cherokee Indians who migrated to Mexico during the 19th century. They are an unrecognized tribe with a presence in Zaragoza, Coahuila, Mexico. According to Robert J. Conley, the Cherokee Nation of Mexico is recognized by the state of Coahuilla.

Their chief is Charles L. Rogers. Charles L. Rogers, the Ancient Cherokee Church of Mexico, the Cherokee Nation of Mexico, and the Native American Church sued American Express Bank and others in Texas Western District Court in 2013.

The Cherokee Nation of Mexico Texas and Coahuila Reservation and Church was headquartered in Brownsville, Texas, United States. Today they are an IRS 170(b)(1)(A)(i) organization, listed as a "Religion-Related, Spiritual Development" and Christian church, with Unconditional Tax Exemption, located in Dripping Springs, Texas.

== See also ==
- Cherokees in Albuquerque, New Mexico, an outlier branch of the Cherokee Nation of Oklahoma
- Cherokee heritage groups
  - Northern Cherokee Nation of the Old Louisiana Territory
  - Texas Cherokees
