= Texas Cherokees =

Cherokee people who lived temporarily in what is now Texas

Texas Cherokees were the small settlements of Cherokee people who lived temporarily in what is now Texas, after being forcibly relocated from their homelands, primarily during the time that Spain, and then Mexico, controlled the territory. After the Cherokee War of 1839, the Cherokee communities in Texas were once again forcibly removed to Indian Territory in present-day Oklahoma. When Union troops took control of Cherokee territory in 1863, many "Southern" Cherokees fled to Texas, but after the war, most of them returned to their homes in Indian Territory.

== History ==
In 1806 a band of Cherokee, most likely migrating south from Cherokee settlements in Arkansas in the Louisiana Territory, founded a village along the Red River. That same year, an intertribal delegation, including Cherokee, petitioned the Spanish officials at Nacogdoches for permission to settle there, which was granted. Cherokee immigration into Texas increased between 1812 and 1819. The Republic of Texas, following Sam Houston's recommendations, established a reservation for the Cherokee, but the negotiated Treaty of 1836 was never ratified (See below).

The Bowl, a former Chickamauga chief, led many Cherokee families into Texas in 1820. They settled near present-day Dallas but were forced by local tribes to move east into what is now Rusk County, Texas. By 1822, an estimated 800 Cherokee lived in Texas.

When Texas passed from Spanish to Mexican governance, Cherokee petitioned the new Mexican authorities for formal land grants but were denied. In 1830, an estimated 800 Cherokee lived in three to seven settlements in Texas. When the Texas Revolution came, the Cherokee settlements tried to remain neutral.

=== The Treaty ===
Having married into a Cherokee family and having a long-standing relationship with Chief Bowl, Sam Houston sought an alliance with the Cherokee while he served as President of Texas. General Houston, with fellow commissioners John Forbes and John Cameron, negotiated a treaty with the settlements for the east Texas lands north of the San Antonio Road and between the Angelina and Neches rivers. This would have created a reservation in the greater part of present-day Cherokee County, all of Smith County and parts of Gregg, Rusk and Van Zandt Counties.

The Senate of the Republic of Texas, however, tabled and refused to ratify the treaty. The settlements, who already thought they had conceded enough in accepting the limits of the treaty, became extremely agitated. When, almost immediately, the Land Office began issuing patents to lands within the Cherokee Nation, the immediate and increasing influx of Anglo settlers into their territory did little to calm resentment.

=== The Cordova Rebellion ===
There was also residual bitterness among some Tejanos still loyal to Mexico and others who felt mistreated by, as they saw it, the new Anglo ruling class. The atmosphere in the Nacogdoches district became tense in early 1838. Complicating matters was that some in the Cherokee settlements were also still loyal to Mexico.

By the summer of that year, there were rumblings of coming insurrection from either or both of those factions, and a contingent of Tejanos led by Vicente Córdova (a former alcalde of Nacogdoches) gathered under arms and, in an affair known as the Córdova Rebellion, began raids against Anglo settlers. Some from the Cherokee settlements were believed to have joined Cordova. In the summer of 1838, evidence was discovered of an active Mexican intrigue to incite members of the east Texas settlements against the Republic.

=== Killough Massacre ===
Responding to this growing unrest, Isaac Killough and his extended family, who had settled in Cherokee lands southeast of the Neches Saline, fled to Nacogdoches for refuge. On condition they would return simply to harvest their crops and leave the area after doing so, the Cherokee leadership sent word to the Killough party that they would not be molested. They did return. On October 5, 1838, a band of Cherokee who had not been party to the agreement attacked the settlement. Most of the Killough group—a total of eighteen—were killed or abducted as they worked their fields. Those who survived fled for a time to Lacy's Fort on the San Antonio Road, just west of present-day Alto, Texas.

Whether or not Chief Bowl or the larger Cherokee community had been complicit in this slaughter, and notwithstanding denials of involvement, this affair was seized upon by Houston's successor, Mirabeau Lamar, as grounds to either expunge Cherokee people from Texas or destroy them. In an address to the Texas Congress on December 20, 1838, Lamar said in part:

If the wild cannibals of the woods will not desist from their massacres, if they will continue to war upon us with the ferocity of tigers an hienas, it is time that we should retaliate their warfare. Not in the murder of their women and children, but in the prosecution of an exterminating war upon their warriors; which will admit of no compromise and have no termination except in their total extinction or their total expulsion.

In a manner of reply, Chief Bowl, leader of the Cherokee, said to the commissioners sent by Lamar in June 1839 to conduct "peace talks:"

If I fight, the whites will kill me. If I refuse to fight, my own people will kill me.

Before the year was over, the Texas Cherokee would be forcibly removed from the settlements in the Cherokee War of 1839. Almost 600 Cherokee, mostly women and children, led by Chief Bowl, fought the Texans in two separate battles on July 15 and 16, 1839. They were defeated and Chief Bowl was killed in the battle of the 16th. Seriously wounded by a shot to the back, and then shot point-blank in the face as he sat incapacitated, the body of the 83-year-old chief was left to rot on the battlefield, his bones on open display for years afterward.

Most of the remaining Texas Cherokee were driven north into Indian Territory (now Oklahoma). Sam Houston was once again elected President of Texas and negotiated peace treaties with them in 1843 and 1844.

From the 1840s on, the original Cherokee Nation sought compensation for the lands they lost in Texas. William Penn Adair was a staunch advocate for the claims of Texas Cherokee.

== Legal status ==
Several groups of Cherokee descendants have organized and on October 10, 2019 Texas Governor Greg Abbott on behalf of the State of Texas granted the Tsalagiyi Nvdagi Tribe (Texas Cherokee) Official Recognition on the occasion of the 200th anniversary and permanent settlement in what is now the State of Texas 1819-2019. Numerous individuals living in Texas today are enrolled in the Cherokee Nation, with fewer enrolled in the United Keetoowah Band, and Eastern Band of Cherokee Indians.

The tribe is a member of the National Council of American Indians. The Tsalagiyi Nvdagi Tribe has received commendations for their contributions to the State of Texas.

== Notable Texas Cherokees ==
- The Bowl Duwali, (d. 1839), Texas Cherokee chief and military leader. Killed at the Battle of the Neches; (Redlands) during the Cherokee War July 1839.
- Stand Watie (1806-1871), Brigadier General Confederate States of America
- Jesse Bartley Milam (1884–1949), Principal Chief of the Cherokee Nation from 1941–1949
- W. W. Keeler (1908–1987), Principal Chief of the Cherokee Nation 1949-1975
- William Penn Adair (1830-1880), Colonel, Confederate States of America. Second in Command under General Stand Watie

== See also ==
- Cherokees in Albuquerque, New Mexico, an outlier branch of the Cherokee Nation of Oklahoma
- Cherokee heritage groups
  - Cherokees in Mexico
  - Northern Cherokee of the Great Plains (the historic Louisiana Territory)
