= Cherokee heritage groups =

United States organization

Cherokee heritage groups are associations, societies and other organizations located primarily in the United States. Such groups consist of persons who do not qualify for enrollment in any of the three federally recognized Cherokee tribes (the Cherokee Nation, the Eastern Band of Cherokee Indians, and the United Keetoowah Band of Cherokee Indians). As the Cherokee Nation enrolls all people who can prove descent from a Cherokee ancestor, many of these groups consist of those who claim Cherokee ancestry but have no documentation to prove this alleged heritage. Some have had their claims of ancestry checked and proven to be false. A total of 819,105 Americans claimed Cherokee heritage in the 2010 Census, more than any other named tribe in the Census.

Some of these heritage groups, notably the authorized satellite communities of the federally recognized tribes, seek to preserve Cherokee language and culture. However, others are groups that have not existed from historical times. Their members may have no connection whatsoever to Cherokee culture or heritage. While some groups are steadfast in their desire to be culturally accurate, and to find documented family connections to the living Cherokee communities, many others may incorporate non-traditional elements such as stereotypes of Hollywood Indian dress, New Age beliefs (cf. plastic shaman), made-up dances and ceremonies, or imitations of what they believe to be Plains-style ceremonies.

A heritage group may incorporate study of genealogy and language study, along with providing social events. Many groups that claim to be tribes, but have no requirement of Cherokee heritage, instead focus on "Indian hobbyism", role-playing, celebrating their ideas of pow wows and other festivals that are not historically part of Cherokee culture. Some have formed in an effort to gain financial benefits through fraudulent means.

The Cherokee Nation encourages people seeking accurate information about Cherokee heritage to become active in "appropriate cultural organizations" rather than those with "unverifiable ties to Native American citizenship", as "the reality is these groups and individuals misrepresent true Indian culture and identity... and typically members know little or nothing about the true culture they claim to represent."

== Origins ==
The origins of these groups can sometimes be found in fraudulent tribes formed by those whose ancestors were rejected from the Dawes Rolls due to not being Cherokee. Non-Natives often fraudulently applied seeking allotment of lands. Other groups may consist of non-Natives with a tiny amount of distant Cherokee heritage, but whose ancestors assimilated so thoroughly, and so long ago, that their family no longer has any traces of Cherokee culture, language or ceremonies. In other cases, there are only vague family stories, sometimes told to explain differences in appearance and hide the existence of African-American ancestors.

In the Indian Territory in what is the present-day state of Oklahoma, the Choctaw, Muscogee Creek, Cherokee, and Natchez formed the Four Mothers Society to resist the federal government's attempts of forced assimilation and allotment of tribal lands.

== Individual recognition ==
Some people who are ineligible for tribal citizenship join heritage groups to identify with the Cherokee people. This identification may be based on documented distant heritage, or family rumors, or on unfounded myths about Native American history.

I am a full-blood Western Cherokee Indian, could not talk the English language until I was fifteen years old.... Enrollment started at the instance of the Dawes Commission and we all experienced a great deal of difficulty in getting enrolling. Lots of the Indians were so hard headed that when the men or investigator came around to see them they would not give any information and consequently were not enrolled. There was a certain class of white man half-breeds and negroes that would run them down and get enrolled. Some of them deserved it and some of them didn't.

— Bird Doublehead, University of Oklahoma, Western History Collections, Interview with Bird Doublehead

While it is true that some Cherokee avoided enrollment, in those cases they almost always married into non-Native families and assimilated. Within a generation or two, their descendants were culturally non-Native, and remain so today.

Some heritage groups are formed by those who rally around a cause such as "Save Kituwah", language preservation, or to maintain cultural art forms such as basket weaving. Both the Eastern and Western Cherokee have master teachers in these art forms with large followings. The rise of Social Media has helped connect individuals with interests in genealogy and heritage.

== Tribal recognition ==
Heritage groups of all these types have sometimes sought recognition as Cherokee tribes. Cherokee Nation spokesman Mike Miller has said that the heritage groups who want to study actual Cherokee language and culture should be encouraged, "but the problem is when you have [unrecognized] groups that call themselves 'nation,' or 'band,' or 'tribe,' because that implies governance."

Many of the heritage groups are controversial for their attempts to gain economically through their (usually false) claims to be Cherokee, a claim which is disputed by two of the federally recognized Tribes, who assert themselves as the only groups having the legal right to present themselves as Cherokee Indian Tribes.

While heritage groups may base their membership on cultural and genealogical requirements, or on nothing more than a stated belief that one has Cherokee ancestry, tribal recognition is more complex in its adherence to academic, legal, historic, sociological, anthropological and genealogical principles. Some of these groups seek state recognition, and in some cases achieve recognition by the state; however,

The Supreme Court made plain the exclusion of states from tribal matters in the earliest and most important cases that make up the foundation of Indian Law. In Worcester v. Georgia, 31 U.S. (6 Pet.) 515 (1832) the Court stated: 'The treaties and laws of the United States contemplate...that all intercourse with [Indians] shall be carried on exclusively by the government of the union.' Real tribes are governments similar to States and Nations.

In the census for the year 2000, there were 729,533 people who self-identified as Cherokee and only about 250,000 people who were enrolled at the time in one of the three Federally Recognized Cherokee Tribes.

== Cherokee Satellite Communities ==
- Cherokee Southwest Township (Albuquerque, New Mexico) (CNO-affiliated since 1999.)

== See also ==
- Cherokee history
- List of organizations that self-identify as Native American tribes
- Cherokees in Texas
- Cherokees in Mexico
- Northern Cherokee Nation of the Old Louisiana Territory
- Native American identity
- Pretendian
- Indigenous identity fraud in Canada and the United States
- Taíno heritage groups
