= Northern Cherokee Nation of the Old Louisiana Territory =

The Northern Cherokee Nation of the Old Louisiana Territory is a 501(c)(3) nonprofit organization of individuals who self-identify as Cherokee but are not state or federally recognized as a Native American tribe or government. The headquarters for the NCNOLT is in Columbia, Missouri.

Members live primarily in Kansas, Missouri, Arkansas, Oklahoma, and Texas. The current chief is Beverly Baker Northup.

While members of the group claim Cherokee ancestry, genealogical research has not corroborated any of these claims.

== History ==
The group incorporated on September 15, 1978, as the Northern Cherokee Tribe of Indians. On March 17, 2014, the organization changed its name to Northern Cherokee Nation of the Old Louisiana Territory.

The Northern Cherokee Nation of the Old Louisiana Territory continues to claim they have state recognition in Missouri, due to a 1983 letter from then-Governor Kit Bond where he personally acknowledged existence of the group; but this letter did not grant them state recognition (which is a legislative process) nor did it grant them recognition by the continuously-existing Cherokee tribes as Cherokee people. The group's claim of Missouri state recognition is called misleading because, according "to a master list maintained by the National Conference of State Legislatures, Missouri recognizes no Indian tribes except those recognized by the federal government."

== Recognition status ==
This organization is neither federally or state recognized. Federal recognition of an Indian tribe can be achieved in one of three ways; by recognition through the Bureau of Indian Affairs, recognition through Acts of Congress or recognition through Courts of Law. State recognition of an Indian tribe differs from state to state but fall into one of four methods, namely: passage of State Statutes and Acts, recognition through State Regulatory Processes, recognition through Joint and Concurrent Resolutions, and recognition through Treaties, Proclamations and Executive Orders. In both cases recognition is accomplished by meeting the requisites for any one of the relative methods of recognition. That means that the BIA can recognize a group and yield that group recognition or Congress can pass a bill recognizing the group.

The Missouri American Indian Council asserts "there are no domestic Indian tribes recognized by the state," insisting that an executive mandate does not constitute the appropriate avenue of recognition but that it must be done by the passage of a state law in the state of Missouri. The NCNOLT has attempted multiple times, since around 1983, to clarify state recognition in Missouri (where it has a 200-year residency) and Arkansas but have not been successful. They have received three declarations from different state governors acknowledging "Northern Cherokee Recognition Day" and the presence of the Northern Cherokee since the late 18th century in the states of Missouri and Arkansas and one county, Boone County in Missouri. The Northern Cherokee Nation of the Old Louisiana Territory filed a Letter of Intent to Petition with the Bureau of Indian Affairs on February 19, 1992, but as of September 22, 2008, no decision had been reached, because the group has submitted no documentation (as of February 15, 2007).

Rocky Miller, a congressman and citizen of the Cherokee Nation, has said that the proclamation issued in June 1983 by then-governor Kit Bond where Bond "acknowledged the existence of the Northern Cherokee Tribe" as "an American Indian Tribe within the State of Missouri" and declared June 24, 1983 Northern Cherokee Recognition Day, "does not make the Northern Cherokee a state-recognized tribe" because "Missouri has no established process for recognizing state tribes, and a list of state-recognized tribes will vary, depending on who you ask."

== Relationship with the federally recognized Cherokees ==
The three federally recognized Cherokee tribes do not acknowledge the claims of the Northern Cherokee Nation of the Old Louisiana Territory.

The Cherokee Nation, headquartered in Tahlequah, Oklahoma, issued a statement asserting that some Cherokee Heritage Groups are encouraged but those that use words that imply governance are not. In an old version of the Cherokee Nation website, an explanation for what is a "true" or "false" tribe was explained. In 2008 the leadership of the Cherokee Nation and the Eastern Band of Cherokee Indians signed a resolution to oppose fabricated Cherokee 'tribes' and denounced state and federal recognition of any new "Cherokee" tribes or bands. The United Keetoowah Band of Cherokee Indians did not participate in the resolution.

In 2000 the U.S. census report 729,533 people self identified as Cherokee Indian. This figure is also more than twice the population of current estimates of all three federally recognized tribes combined.

== Middle Eastern origin stories ==
Chief Beverly Baker Northup self-published a book, We Are Not Yet Conquered (2001), and in the first chapter wrote her perspective on to the origins of the ancestry of the Cherokee people. Northup explains in this chapter that she believes that a group of Middle Eastern people (she suggests they could have been Sicarii and surviving defenders of Masada) crossed the Atlantic Ocean and intermarried with Indian peoples making up the Cherokee. Northup's suggestion of Jewish ancestry for Cherokee people was featured in the book Weird Missouri and was compared to the Mormon belief system; a similar idea also forms part of the beliefs of Christian Identity and British Israelism. The claimed connection between Amerindians and the Ten Lost Tribes has spread on Indian and Israelite oriented websites alike and has sparked disdain as well as approval.

== Membership controversy ==
Dr. Carol Morrow from the Southeast Missouri State University in Cape Girardeau suggested that eligibility for membership is determined by Beverly Baker Northup who has been voted out of office more than once and who has obtained $120,000 in federal grant money to be used for completing the tribe's federal recognition process, which has not yet been completed. Northup believes that Governor Mel Carnahan's bill of acknowledgment speaks to her legitimacy in office as the question of her having been voted out of office predated 1996.

== See also ==
- List of organizations that self-identify as Native American tribes
- Cherokee#Tribal recognition and citizenship
- Cherokee heritage groups
