= Historic Cherokee settlements =

Early Cherokee settlements established in North America

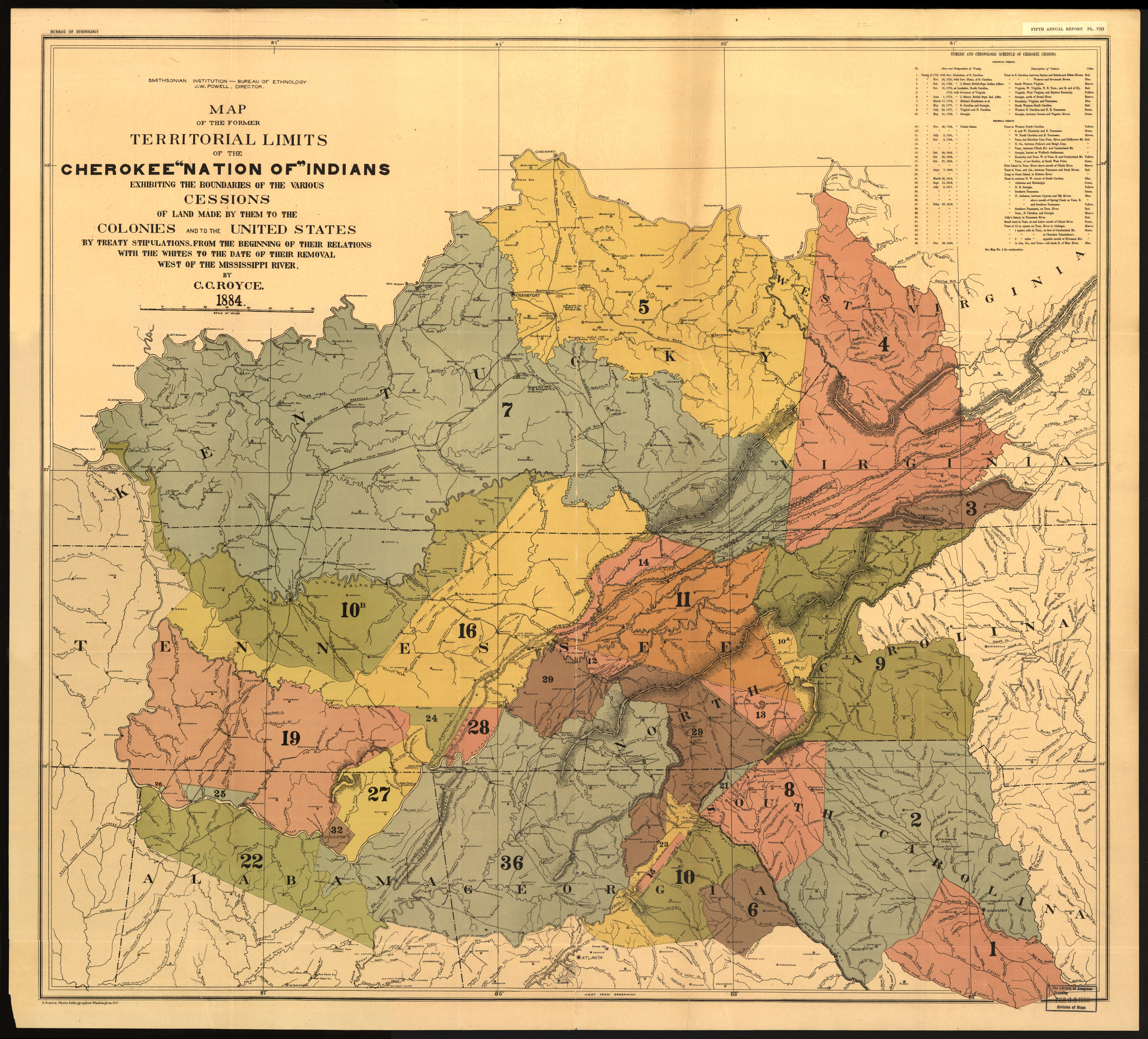
Map of the Former Territorial Limits of the Cherokee "Nation of" Indians Exhibiting Various Cessations Made by Them to the Colonies and the United States, C.C. Royce, 1884

The historic Cherokee settlements were Cherokee settlements established in Southeastern North America up to the removals of the early 19th century. Several settlements had existed prior to and were initially contacted by explorers and colonists of the colonial powers as they made inroads into frontier areas. Others were established later.

In the early 18th century, an estimated 2100 Cherokee people inhabited more than sixteen towns east of the Blue Ridge Mountains and across the Piedmont plains in what was then considered Indian Country. (Note: "Cherokee "towns" were settlements equipped with a great hall or council halls (Cherokee:gatuyi, or town house); villages and satellite settlements usually had no communal great halls.") Generally, European visitors noted only the towns with townhouses. Some of their maps included lesser settlements, but "the centers of towns were clearly marked by townhouses and plazas."

The early Cherokee towns east of the Blue Ridge Mountains were geographically divided into two regions: the Lower Towns (of the Piedmont coastal plains in what are now northeastern Georgia and western South Carolina), and the Middle/Valley/Out Towns (east of the Appalachian Mountains). A third group, the Overhill Towns, located on the western side of the Appalachian Mountains, made up the remainder of the Cherokee settlements of the time. Within each regional group, towns exhibited close economic, linguistic, and religious ties; they were often developed for miles along rivers and creeks. Satellite villages near the regional towns often bore the same or similar names to the regional centers. The minor settlements shared architecture and a common culture, but they maintained political autonomy.

== Town locations ==
No list could ever be complete of all Cherokee settlements; however, in 1755 the government of South Carolina noted several known towns and settlements. Those identified were grouped into six "hunting districts:" 1) Overhill, 2) Middle, 3) Valley, 4) Out Towns, 5) Lower Towns, and 6) the Piedmont settlements, also called Keowee towns, as they were along the Keowee River. In 1775 – May 1776, explorer and naturalist William Bartram described a total of 43 Cherokee towns in his Travels in North America, after living for a time in the area. Cherokee were living in each of them.

The Cherokee also established new settlements—or moved existing settlements—using the same or very similar names from one location to another, as the names were associated with a community of people. This practice complicated the historical recording and tracking by Europeans of many early settlement locations. Examples of this practice of repeated names include "Sugar Town," "Chota/Echota," and "Etowa/h," to name just a few.

=== Lower / Keowee settlements ===
The Lower Towns in that period were considered to be those in the northern part of the Colony of Georgia and northwestern area of the Colony of South Carolina; many were based along the Keowee River, including: the major towns of Seneca and Keowee New Towne; as well as, Cheowie, Cowee, Coweeshee, Echoee, Elejoy, Estatoie, Old Keowee, Oustanalla, Oustestee, Tomassee, Torsalla, Tosawa (also later spelled Toxaway), Torsee, and Tricentee. In addition, since the late 20th century, archeologists have identified historic Cherokee townhouses dating from the sixteenth through the early eighteenth century at the towns known as Chauga (where the Cherokee were identified as occupying it in the last of four phases) and Chattooga site, both in present-day western South Carolina; and Tugalo, in present-day northeastern Georgia. The latter site is now inundated by Lake Hartwell.

=== Middle, Valley, and Out Towns ===
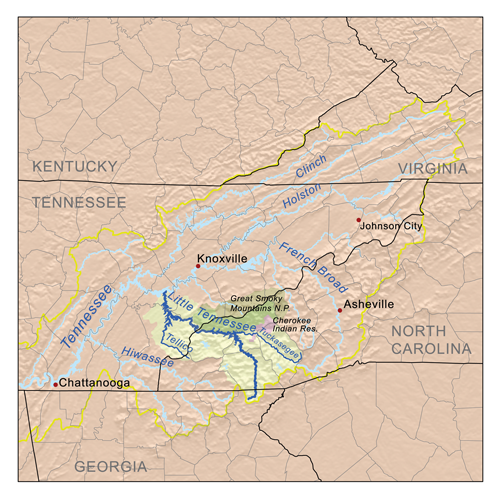
Little Tennessee River and watershed; Hiwassee River to the south, Tuckaseegee to the north

The Middle Towns of western North Carolina Colony were primarily along the upper Little Tennessee River and its tributaries. The Cherokee towns and related settlements in this area included Comastee, Cotocanahuy, Euforsee, Little Telliquo, Nayowee, Nuckasee, Steecoy, and Watoge.

Since the late 20th century, the federally recognized Eastern Band of Cherokee Indians and partners have reacquired some of these former town sites in their homeland for preservation. These include the sites of Nuckasee, Steecoy, and Watoge along the Little Tennessee River. These will be featured as part of the planned "Nikwasi-Cowee Corridor".

The Valley Towns consisted of those along the upper Hiwassee River and its tributary the Valley River, and the Nantahala River, which flowed into the Little Tennessee River from the south. These rivers were all south of the Little Tennessee. Valley Towns included Chewohe, Tomately, and Quanassee.

The Out Towns were located slightly north of the Little Tennessee, mainly along its tributary the Tuckaseegee River and its tributary, the Oconaluftee River. Towns and settlements included Conontoroy, Joree, Kittowa (the 'mother town' of the Cherokee, which was reacquired by the EBCI in 1996), Nununyi, Oustanale, Tucharechee, and Tuckaseegee.

=== Overhill settlements ===
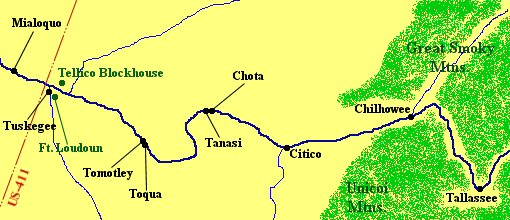
Overhill towns of the Cherokee

Both the Little Tennessee River and the Hiwassee River flowed through the mountains into what is present-day Tennessee, where they ultimately each flowed into the Tennessee River at different points. Early Cherokee Overhill settlements included those on the lower Little Tennessee River: Chilhowee, Chota, Citico, Mialoquo, Tallassee, Tanasi, Tomotley, Toqua, and Tuskegee (Island Town); those on the Tellico River: Chatuga and Great Tellico; and those on the lower Hiwassee River: Chestowee and Hiwassee Old Town.

== 1776 town losses ==
Following the failed two-prong attack against the frontier settlements of the Washington District in the summer of 1776, the colonies of Virginia, North and South Carolina, and Georgia mounted a retaliatory attack against all the Cherokee towns. It was known as the Rutherford Light Horse expedition, and militias attacked the Cherokee on both sides of the mountains, destroying many towns. The Cherokee had allied with the British in the hopes of expelling the newly independent US colonists from their territory. After these attacks, the Cherokee sued for peace with the Americans. By January 1777 the Upper Town Cherokee had made a peace.

== New towns period ==
A large following of Cherokee, however, refused to settle with the encroaching Americans and moved further south. Under the war chiefs Dragging Canoe, Black Fox, and Little Turkey, they settled many additional locations throughout the southeastern United States, mostly driven by events of the ongoing Cherokee–American wars. This Chickamauga faction moved further downstream on the Tennessee River system, establishing 11 new towns well away from the American frontier.

Following further conflicts with the military of the fledgling United States, in 1782 Dragging Canoe established five new "Lower Towns" even further downstream along the Tennessee River. The original five towns included: Running Water town (Amogayunyi) (Dragging Canoe's new headquarters); Long Island on the Holston (Amoyeligunahita); Crow Town (Kagunyi); Lookout Mountain town (Utsutigwayi, or Stecoyee); and Nickajack (Ani-Kusati-yi, meaning Koasati Old-place). The Chickamauga also re-established a small military presence in Tuskegee Island Town at this time.

Additional settlements in the area were quickly developed, following the arrival of more members to join Dragging Canoe's force. These people became known more properly as the Lower Cherokee, as opposed to Chickamauga. Their settlements included the major, regional town of Creek Path town (Kusanunnahiyi); Turkeytown; Turnip town (Ulunyi); Willstown (Titsohiliyi); and Chatuga (Tsatugi).

== Leadership ==
The Cherokee were highly decentralized and their towns were the most important units of government. The Cherokee Nation did not yet exist. Before 1788, the only leadership role that existed with the Cherokee people was a town's or region's "First Beloved Man" (or Uku). The First Beloved Man would be the usual contact person and negotiator for the people under his leadership, especially when dealing with European or frontier government representatives.

Starting in 1788, a supreme First Beloved Man was elected to run a national Cherokee council. This group alternated between meeting at Willstown and Turkeytown, but it convened irregularly and had little authority with the people. The First Beloved Man of each town still maintained a substantial amount of authority. The murders of the Overhill pacifist chiefs—including Old Tassel, the regional headman—who that same year were lured to parley with the State of Franklin and ambushed instead, resulted in an increasingly violent period between the Cherokee and American settlers. A definitive peace was finally achieved in 1794. The ambush had resulted in driving many of the Upper Cherokee, who at the time were more supportive of some adaptation to European-American ways, into union with the Lower Cherokee leadership.

By the time of Dragging Canoe's death (January 29, 1792), the Cherokee settlements of the Lower Towns had increased from five to seven. The re-populated New Keowee was still the principal town of the region. Up until 1794, when the fighting stopped and the national council ground moved to Ustanali, the Cherokee remained a fragmented people. At the founding of the first Cherokee Nation in 1794, the now united people still controlled a large area encompassing lands now located in several states, including: Tennessee, North Carolina, South Carolina, Georgia, and Alabama.

The Cherokee Nation's five regional councils of 1794 comprised 1) the Overhill Towns; 2) the Hill Towns; 3) the traditional Valley Towns; 4) the new Upper Towns (these were the former Lower Towns of southern North Carolina, western South Carolina, and northeastern Georgia); and 5) the new Lower Towns (newly occupied settlements located in north and central Alabama, southeastern Tennessee, and far northwestern Georgia).

== Peacetime ==
The constant warfare took its toll on the traditional Cherokee settlements. Several had become permanently de-populated by the turn of the 19th century. The settled areas stabilized for a time following the 1794 establishment of the Cherokee Nation and partial acculturation of the people in the east. Following The Removal era (1815–1839), however, many of these settlements were all but abandoned forever.

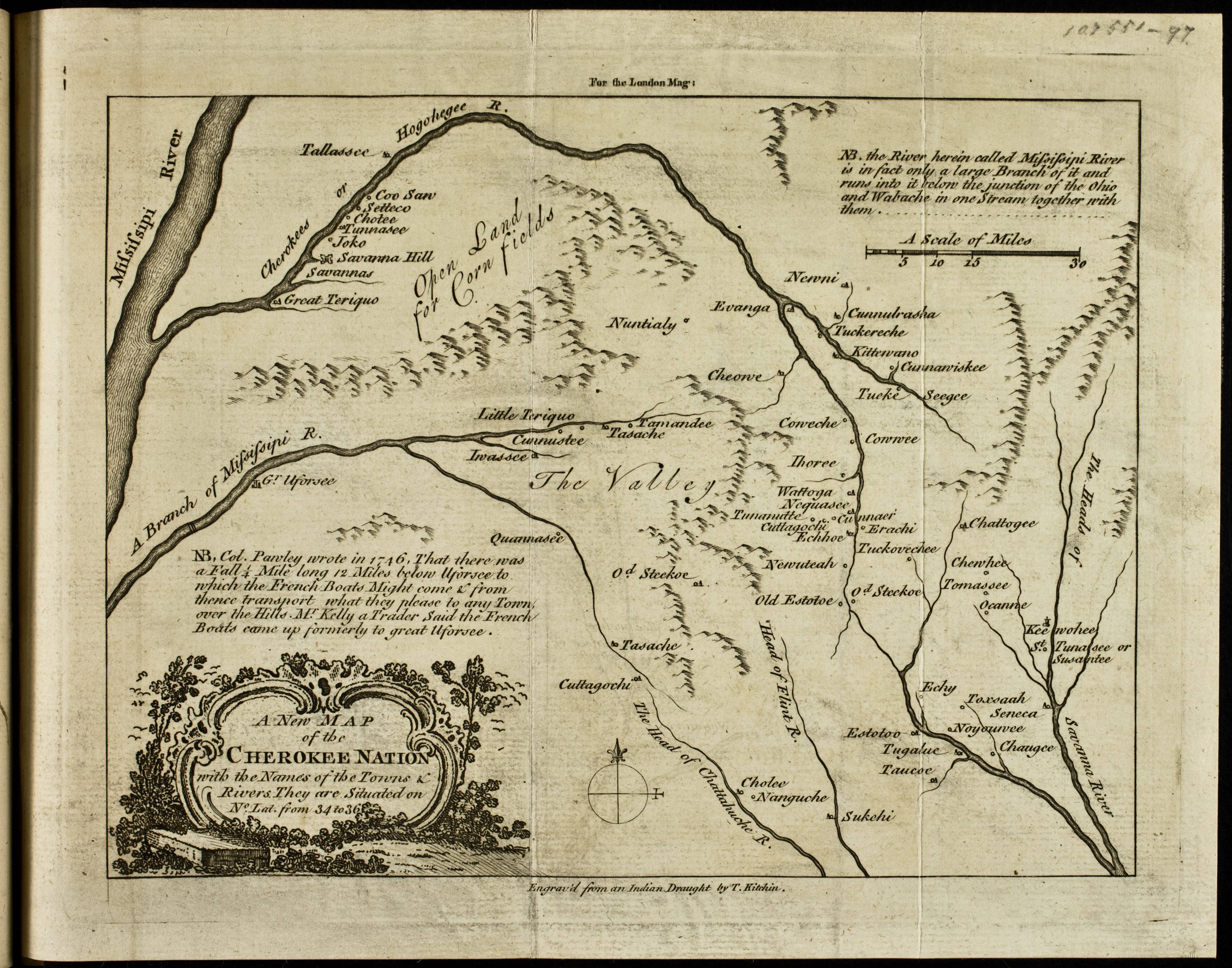
Cherokee Nation c.1760

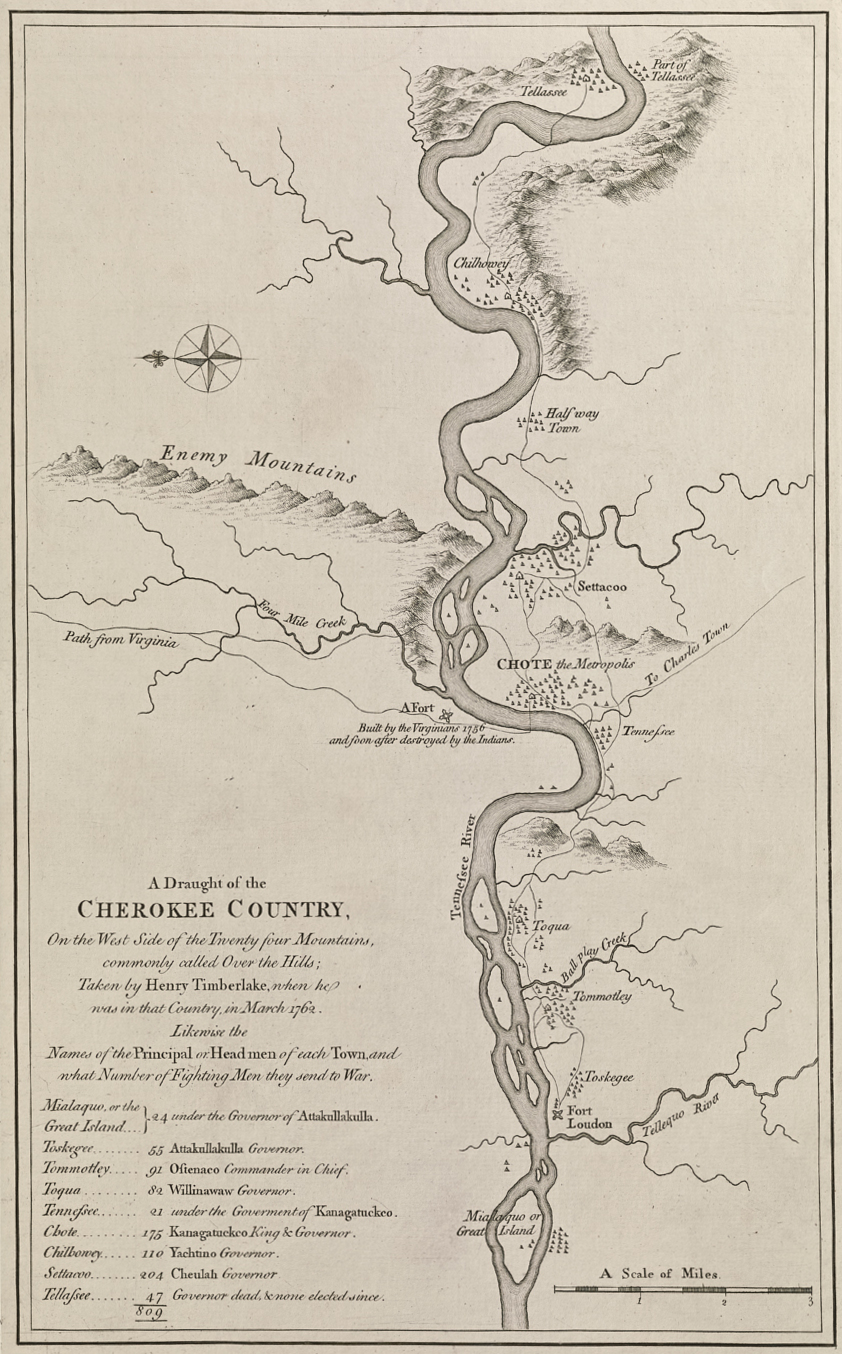
A Draught of the Cherokee Country, Henry Timberlake (1762) Overhill Towns

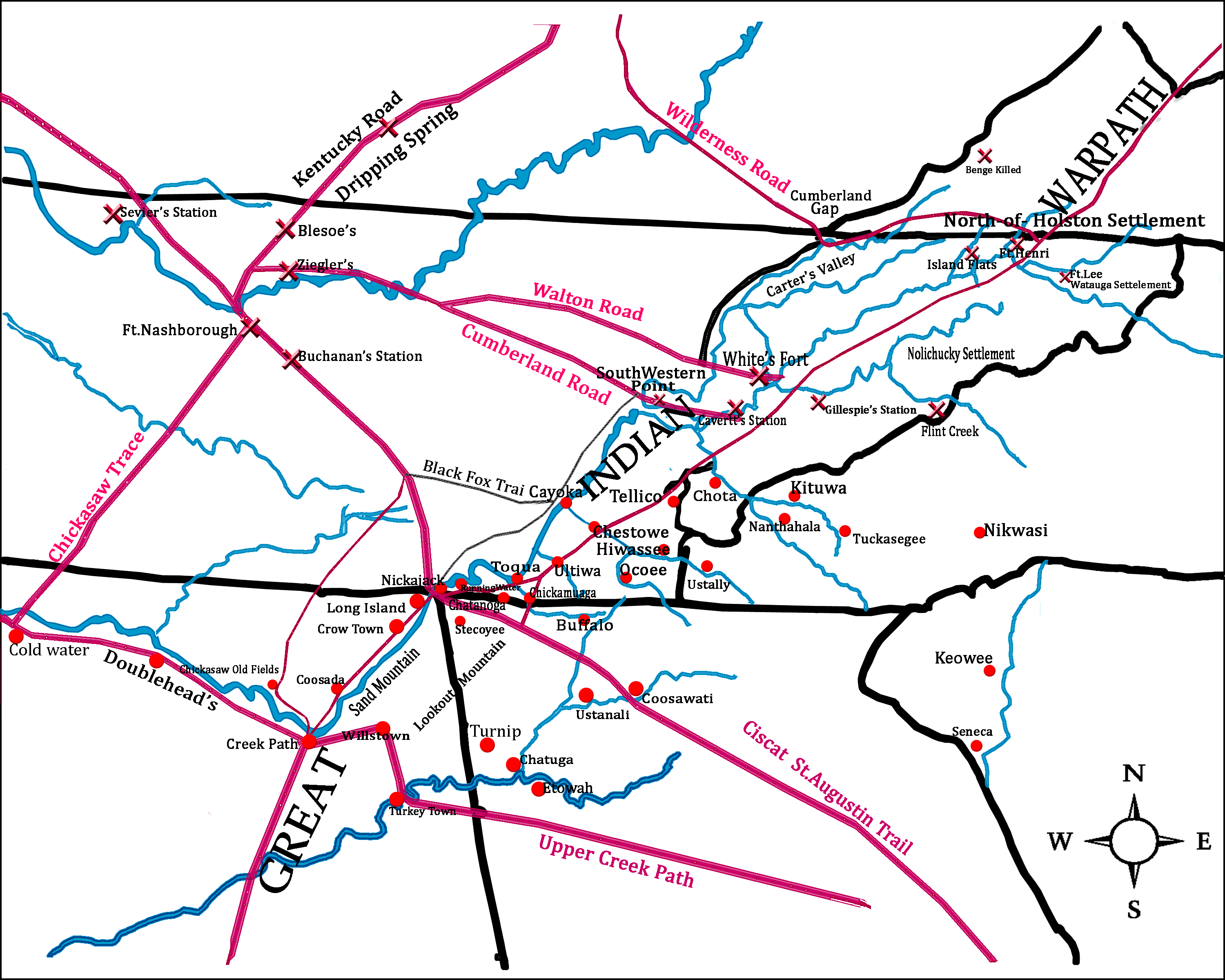
Post-Revolution Cherokee towns

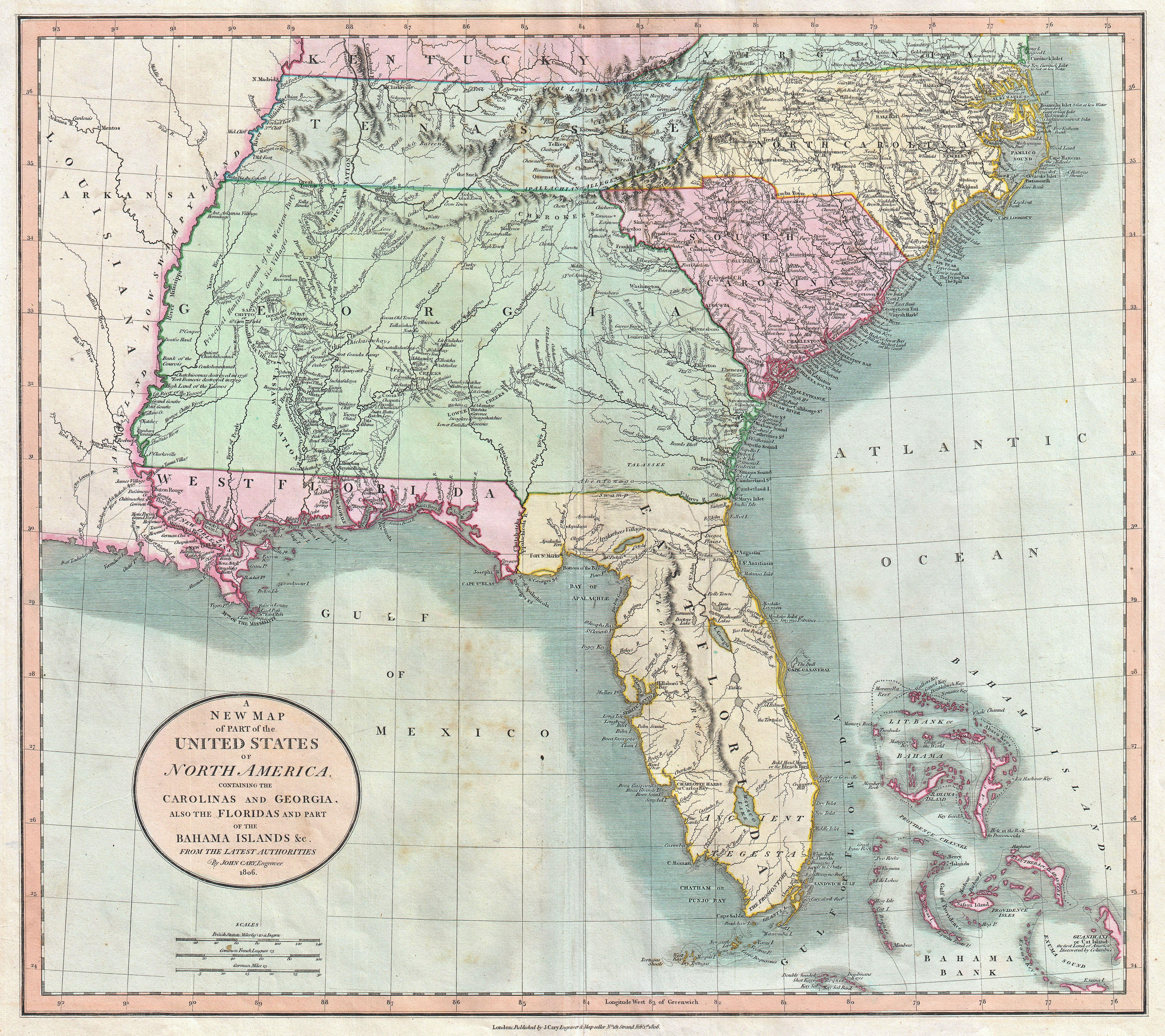
Native American settlements of the Southeastern United States (1806)

== Cherokee settlements ==
A partial list of pre-removal Cherokee settlements
| Town or settlement | Native & alternate names | Syllabary | Location today | State | Group* | Site status | Notable resident(s) | Importance notes |
|---|---|---|---|---|---|---|---|---|
| Black Fox | Inaliyi | ᎡᎾᎵᏱ | On the Clinch River near Black Fox, Bradley County, Tennessee | TN | LT-11 | est. c.1777; abandoned; submerged 1936 | Black Fox; (before 1788) | Established by Dragging Canoe's Chickamauga Cherokee faction, c.1777; flooded by Norris Lake |
| Cayuga town | Cayoka | ᎦᏳᎦ | On Hiwassee Island in Hamilton County | TN | LT-11 | est. 1777; abandoned | Tahlonteeskee | established by Dragging Canoe |
| Chatanugi | Tsatanugi | ᏣᏔᏄᎩ | Along Chattanooga Creek in St. Elmo neighborhood, Chattanooga, Hamilton County | TN | LT-11 | est. 1777; abandoned 1787 | | Choctaw-nooga was established by Dragging Canoe (Note: "-nooga" means "dwellers" in Cherokee) |
| Chatuga | Tsaduga; Chatugee | ᏣᏚᎦ | Polk County | TN | OH | abandoned | | Sister-town of Great Tellico. |
| Chestowee | Chestue | ᏤᏍᏚᎢ | on the Hiwassee River in Bradley County | TN | MVO | abandoned | | Originally a Yuchi settlement whose fall to the Cherokee marked their rise as a regional power. |
| Chickamauga town | Tsikamagi | ᏥᎦᎹᎩ | On the Tennessee–Georgia line; along Chickamauga Creek | TN | LT-11 | abandoned | | A Creek town occupied by those following Dragging Canoe in 1776–1777; became common frontier name for his faction of Cherokee. |
| Chilhowee | Tsulunwe; Chilhowey | ᏧᎷᎾᎢ | Along the Little Tennessee in Monroe County | TN | OH | abandoned 1776; razed 1776; submerged 1957 | Old Abraham; Yachtino | Originally the Muscogee town of Chalahume; on the Little Tennessee River; (Note: "Chilhowee" is a Cherokee corruption of the Muskogean Chalahume, the town's original occupants) burned in late 1776 prior to William Christian's combined ranger and militia attack during the Cherokee War of 1776; flooded by the Chilhowee Lake. |
| Chota | Echota; Chote; Itsati; Itsasa | ᎢᏣᏘ or ᎢᏣᏌ | On the Little Tennessee River in Monroe County | TN | OH | abandoned; submerged 1979 | Conocotocko; Savanukah; Attakullakulla; Oconostota; Old Tassel; Hanging Maw; Nancy Ward | Principal city of the Overhill Cherokee, c.1748–1788; flooded by Tellico Lake. |
| Citico Old Towne; Satapo | Settacoo; Sittiquo | ᏎᏖᎫ | In Monroe County | TN | OH | abandoned 1776; razed 1776; submerged 1979 | Moytoy of Citico | Probable location of "Satapo Village" visited by Juan Pardo; near the confluence of the Little Tennessee River and the lower Tellico River, The Cherokee abandoned and burned the town —along with several other Overhill settlements—prior to, or immediately following, the attacks on the Wautaga settlements in mid-1776, and what was left of the town and fields were razed in late 1776 by the William Christian's Virginian combined ranger and militia element during the Cherokee War of 1776; flooded by Tellico Lake. |
| Citico | Sitiku | ᏎᏔᎫ | In Chattanooga, Hamilton County | TN | LT-11 | est. 1777; abandoned; demo'd 2017; extinct | Cheulah | Moved to Chickamauga Creek area from the Old Towne before 1777, as its entire population followed Dragging Canoe south; archeological site demolished for a private college student-housing development in 2017. |
| Coyotee town | Coyote | ᎪᏲᏘ | | TN | OH | | Hanging Maw | |
| Ducktown | Gawonvyi; Kawana | ᎦᏬᏅᏱ | Ducktown, Polk County | TN | OH | abandoned | Chief Duck | In the 1840s and 1850s, Ducktown was called "Hiwassee" or "Hiawassee." |
| Great Hiwassee | Ayuhwasi Egwaha; Euphase | ᎠᏴᏩᏏ ᎢᏆᎭ | Polk County | TN | OH | abandoned | | Important Overhill Cherokee town located along the Hiwassee River. (Note: Hiwassee means "savanna" or "plain.") |
| Great Island | Mialoquo; Amayelegwa; Big Island | ᎠᎹᏰᎴᏆ | Monroe County | TN | OH | abandoned 1776; razed 1776; submerged | Dragging Canoe (before 1776); Attakullakulla | Under the leadership of Attakullakulla, father of Dragging Canoe; burned in late 1776 by William Christian's combined ranger and militia element during the Cherokee War of 1776; an island now submerged in the Little Tennessee River. |
| Great Tellico | Telliquo; Talikwa | ᏔᎵᏆ or ᏖᎵᏉ | near Tellico Plains in Monroe County | TN | OH | abandoned 1776; razed 1776 | Moytoy of Tellico; Amouskositte; Jacob the Conjurer | Principal city of the Cherokee 1730 – c.1748; burned in late 1776 prior to William Christian's combined ranger and militia attack during the Cherokee War of 1776; |
| Little Tellico | Little Telliquo | | | TN | OH | | | Sister village of Great Tellico. |
| Long Island on the Holston | Amoyeli-gunahita | ᎠᎼᏰᎵ ᎫᎾᎯᏔ | Site is now Kingsport, Tennessee on border of Sullivan – Hawkins counties | TN | LT-5 | abandoned | | |
| Nickajack | Koasati place Ani-Kusati-yi (Niquatse’gi) | ᎠᏂ ᎫᏌᏘ Ᏹ (ᏂᏆᏤᎩ) | Marion County | TN | LT-5 | Est. 1782; abandoned; submerged 1967 | The Glass; (after 1782) | Nickajack Cave and surrounding areas were settled and inhabited by Chickamauga starting c.1777; site partially flooded by the Nickajack Lake in 1967. (Note: Nickajack had been known to those that had dealings with the Muscogee as Coushatta town (or Koasati town), meaning Koasati place, or place of the Coushatta people (those of the Coosa chiefdom). The Chickamauga called it Niquatse’gi (pronounced Nee-kwa-j[ch]ay-k[g]ee).) |
| Ocoee | Ocoee | ᎣᎪᎢ | Ocoee, Polk County | TN | OH | abandoned | | |
| Ultiwa | Ooltewah | ᎤᎳᏘᏩ | Near Ooltewah, Hamilton County | TN | LT-11 | est. 1777; abandoned | Ostenaco | Founded by the skiagusta, Ostenaco. |
| Opelika | Opelika | ᎤᏇᎵᎦ | Near East Ridge, Hamilton County | TN | LTK | est. c.1790; abandoned | | |
| Running Water town | Amogayunyi | ᎠᎼᎦᏳᎾᏱ | now Whiteside, Marion County | TN | LT-5 | est. 1782; absorbed | The Bowl; Dragging Canoe; Bob Benge | Later Chickamauga head-town |
| Sawtee | Itsati | ᎢᏣᏘ | Between South Sauta Creek and North Chickamauga Creek in Hamilton County | TN | LT-11 | est. 1777; abandoned | Little Owl | |
| Tallassee | Talassee; Talisi; Tellassee | ᏔᎵᏏ | near the Calderwood, a ghost town in Blount County | TN | OH | abandoned 1819; submerged 1957 | | Southernmost of the Overhill Cherokee towns; population left after signing of the Treaty of Calhoun (1819); site submerged by Chilhowee Lake. (Note: This Tallassee Cherokee town should not be confused with modern Tallassee, Tennessee.) |
| Tanasi | Tennessee | ᏔᎾᏏ | On Little Tennessee River, Monroe County | TN | OH | abandoned; submerged 1979 | Tanasi Warrior | Principal city of the Cherokee until 1730; site submerged by Tellico Lake. |
| Tomotley | Tamahli | ᏔᎹᏟ | Monroe County | TN | OH | abandoned; submerged 1979 | Ostenaco | Site is adjacent to Toqua, one of its satellite villages; flooded by Tellico Lake. |
| Toqua | Dakwayi | ᏓᏆᏱ or ᏙᏆ | Monroe County | TN | OH | abandoned 1776; razed 1776; re-occupied 1777; abandoned; submerged 1979 | Willinawa; Old Tassel | Adjacent to Tomotley; burned in late 1776 prior to William Christian's combined ranger and militia attack during the Cherokee War of 1776; re-occupied by Dragging Canoe c.1777; flooded by Tellico Reservoir. |
| Tuckasegee | Tuckasegee; Dvkasigi | ᏛᎧᏏᎩ | Far East Tennessee Unicoi Mountains | TN | MVO | abandoned | Bloody Fellow (Aaron Price) | Site, site near the NC/TN border. |
| Tuckasegee | Tuckasegee; Dvkasigi | ᏛᎧᏏᎩ | Western NCorth Carolina, upper Tuckasegee River | NC | MVO | | | Site on the upper Tuckaseegee River; shown on Kichin 1760 map and others |
| Tuskegee Island Town | Taskigi; Toskegee | ᏔᏥᎩ | Near Williams Island in Chattanooga, Monroe County | TN | OH / (LT-5) | abandoned 1776; razed 1776; re-occupied 1782; submerged 1979 | Attakullakulla; Sequoyah | Burned in late 1776 prior to William Christian's combined ranger and militia attack during the Cherokee War of 1776; but re-occupied by the Chickamauga at the time of the move to the five Lower Towns; site submerged by Tellico Reservoir. |
| Wautaga | Watagi | ᏩᏔᎩ | On the Wautaga River next to Elizabethton, Carter County | TN | OH | burned 1776; abandoned; extant; mound 2020 | | Burned 1776. |
| Cane Creek | Coweeshee; Coweshe | ᎪᏫᏍᎯ | On Cane Creek in Oconee County. | SC | LTK | razed (1776); abandoned 1792 | | A satellite village of Keowee; burned along with its corn fields by Neel (1776). |
| Canuga town | Canugi | ᎧᏅᎦ | On the Keowee in Pickens County | SC | MVO | abandoned | | |
| Chatuga Old Town | Tsatugi; Chatogy | ᏣᏚᎩ | On the Chattooga River, Oconee County | SC | MVO | razed 1776; abandoned | | Burned in 1776 by Col. Neel in the Williamson Campaign. |
| Chauga | Chawgee; Takwashwaw | ᏣᎤᎩ or ᏔᏆᏍᏆ | Between the Tugaloo and Seneca Rivers in Oconee County | SC | MVO | abandoned; excavated 1953; mound 1958; submerged 1959 | | Flooded by Lake Hartwell on the Tugaloo. |
| Cheowee | Chiowee; Chehowee; | ᏤᎣᏫ or ᏥᎣᏫ | Oconee County | SC | MVO | abandoned c.1752; re-occupied; razed 1776 | | Cherokee fled from Creek incursions in 1752; town burned in 1776 by Col. Neel in the Williamson Campaign. |
| Cowee | | | | SC | LTK | abandoned | | |
| Ustanately | Ustana'li'; Eustanali | ᎤᏍᏔᎾᏟ | On the Keowee River in Oconee County | SC | LTK | abandoned (1751); rebuilt 1750s; razed 1776; abandoned; extinct | | Abandoned in late 1751 when Creek Indians attacked. |
| Ecochee | Echy; Echay; Echia | ᎡᎪᏥ or ᎡᏤ | On the Savannah River and the Toxaway Creek. | SC | LTK | razed; abandoned 1770; extinct | | "...Forsaken and destroyed..." by 1770. |
| Ellijay | Elijoy; Elatse'yi' | ᎡᎳᏤᏱ | Oconee County | SC | LTK | Abandoned; extant footprint | | Was near the headwaters of Keowee on the site of old Camp Jocasse (early 1900s); one of three settlements with this name; |
| Estanari | Oustlnare lstanory | ᎡᏍᏔᎾᎵ | Oconee County | SC | LTK | abandoned | | |
| Eustaste | Ousteste; Ustustee; Oustana | ᎤᏍᏖᏍᏖ | | SC | LTK | razed 1776; abandoned | | Destroyed in 1776 by Williamson. |
| Estatoie | Eastato; Eslootow; Oustato; Easttohoe | ᎡᏍᏔᏙᏪ | On the Tugalo River | SC | LTK | abandoned 1750s; rebuilt 1759; razed 1760; abandoned | | Estatoe was reestablished just downstream from the original site; Estatoe Old Towne was a regional political center from 1730 to at least 1753; occupied by the Creeks (late 1750s); re-populated by Cherokee afterward; Montgomerie burned the town in 1760 and Williamson in 1776. |
| Seneca Old Towne | Isunigu; Esseneca; Senekaw | ᎢᏑᏂᎬ | On the Keowee River, near present-day Clemson and Seneca in Oconee County. | SC | LTK | abandoned; razed 1776; submerged 1959 | | Attacked prior to the Battle of Twelve Mile Creek involving Williamson's force; flooded by Lake Hartwell reservoir; (Note: Seneca Town was on the northwest side of the Keowee River, near the mouth of Coneross Creek, in today's Oconee County.) the modern day town of Seneca, South Carolina is its namesake, although the meaning of the transliterated "Isunigu" is lost. Across the river from Hopewell plantation (see Three Treaties of Hopewell). |
| Old Keowee | Keyhowe | ᎨᎣᏫ | On the Keowee River in Oconee County. | SC | LTK | abandoned 1752; razed 1760; abandoned 1776; submerged 1974 | Nathaniel Gist | Located along the Lower Cherokee Traders Path; it was the largest of the "Lower Towns" and part of the Upper Road through the Piedmont; across the river from Fort Prince George; destroyed by the British, Creeks, and Chickasaws in 1760; flooded by Lake Keowee. |
| Keowee New Towne | Kuwoki; Little Keowee | ᎫᏬᎩ | West of Keowee, on Mile Creek in Pickens County. | SC | LTK | est. 1752; attacked 1760; razed 1776; abandoned c.1816; submerged 1974 | | Established 1752 following the break-up of the Lower Towns in anticipation of Creek raids; Expedition under James Grant killed all male inhabitants in 1760 (woman and children spared); this is the "Keowee" destroyed by Pickens and Williamson in 1776; de-populated c.1816 when residents moved to Qualla Boundary. |
| Noyowee | Nayowee; No-a-wee | ᏃᏲᏫ | On the Chauga River in Oconee County | SC | LTK | razed 1724; razed 1776; abandoned; extinct | | Attacked by the Creek in 1724; destroyed during the Williamson Campaign of 1776; there were several Lower Towns named Nayowee. |
| Oconee Town | Ae-quo-nee; Uquunu | ᎤᏊᏄ | Near Oconee Station, in the Pickens District now Oconee County. | SC | LTK | razed 1760; razed 1776; abandoned | | The British razed the town in 1760; the Americans burned it in 1776; was at the intersection of the Indian trading path and the Cherokee treaty boundary of 1777; Oconee County is its namesake. |
| Qualhatchie | Qualahatchie; Quaratchee; Qualucha | ᏆᎳᎭᏥ | Straddled Crow Creek | SC | LTK | abandoned 1795 | | British Colonel Montgomerie burned the town in 1760; in 1776, it was again burned to the ground—without a battle—by the Americans. |
| Saluda Old Town | Tsaludiyi | ᏣᎷᏗᏱ | Below Ninety-Six, Greenwood County | SC | LTK | abandoned | | One of the seven original Cherokee mother towns. (Note: Tsaludiyi translates as "green corn place.") |
| Socony | Soquani; Socauny | ᏐᏆᏂ | Site is at the junction of Twelve Mile River and Town Creek, near Pickens, Pickens County | SC | LTK | razed 1776; abandoned | | The easternmost of the Cherokee settlements in 1775; burned in 1776 by Col. Neel in the Williamson Campaign. |
| Sugar Town of Toxso | Conasatchee; Kulsetsiyi | ᎫᎳᏎᏥᏱ | Above Fort Prince George (on the Keowee River near Salem in Oconee County) | SC | LTK | razed 1760; razed 1776; resettled; abandoned; submerged 1973 | Oconaco of Sugar Town | Sacked and burned in 1760 by the British; destroyed by Williamson raid August 4, 1776; flooded by Lake Jocassee reservoir; there were several historic towns named "Sugartown" in the Cherokee lands of the southeastern United States; this is the most documented location. |
| Tamassee Town | Tomassee; Tomatly | ᏔᎹᏏ | On the Little River system of Oconee County. | SC | LTK | abandoned c.1740; razed 1776; abandoned | | Was abandoned during the Creek wars of the 1740s & 1750s; re-populated by 1775; burned in 1776 during the Williamson Campaign; was the site of Andrew Pickens' tactical "Ring fight" against the towns' Cherokee defenders in 1776. |
| Torsalla | | | | SC | LTK | abandoned | | |
| Torsee | | | | SC | LTK | abandoned | | |
| Toxaway | Toicksaw; Tusoweh; Toxsaah | ᏚᏆᏌᎢ | On Toxaway River in Oconee County. | SC | LTK | razed 1760; rebuilt 1762; razed 1776; abandoned 1776 | Raven of Toxaway | Burned by Montgomery in 1760; rebuilt by 1762; burned during American Revolutionary War expedition and finally abandoned on August 6, 1776. |
| Tricentee | | ᏟᏎᎾᏘ | Oconee County. | SC | LTK | abandoned | | A satellite of Cane Creek. |
| Tucharechee | Takwashuaw | ᏚᏣᎴᏥ | Oconee County | SC | LTK | abandoned | | |
| Brasstown | Brass; Ûňtsaiyĭ; Itse'yĭ' | ᎡᏦᏪ | Site is now Brasstown Clay and Cherokee counties | NC | MVO | removed 1838; absorbed 1838 | | One of several locations with the "Brasstown" name. (Note: Ûňtsaiyĭ translates to "brass; Itse'yĭ' translates to "new green place.") population removed to Indian Territory in 1838. |
| Chewohe | Chewohee | ᏤᏬᎯ | | NC | MVO | abandoned | | |
| Conoske | Comastee | | | NC | MVO | abandoned | | |
| Cotocanahuy | | | | NC | MVO | abandoned | | |
| Etowah mountain town | italwa | ᎡᏙᏩ | Near Etowah, Henderson County | NC | LTK | razed 1776; abandoned; extinct | | Burned in the Rutherford Light Horse expedition; (Note: The word Etowah comes from the Muskogee/Creek word italwa meaning "town.") |
| Euforsee | | | | NC | MVO | abandoned | | |
| Joree | Jore | ᏲᎵ | | NC | MVO | abandoned | Kittagusta | |
| Kituwa | Keetoowah; Giduwa | ᎩᏚᏩ | Just outside Bryson City, Swain County | NC | MVO | razed 1761; abandoned 1761; extinct | | Principal town of the original seven Cherokee settlements, or "mother towns;" Abandoned in 1761 when inhabitants fled west and founded Great Island Town. |
| Nanthahala | Aquone | ᎠᏉᏁ | Site near Aquone Macon County, North Carolina community | NC | MVO | abandoned; submerged 1942 | | Submerged by Nantahala Lake. |
| Nikwasi | Noquisi; Nequassee | ᏃᏈᏍᎢ or ᏁᏆᏍᎢ | Site is along Little Tennessee River in Franklin, Macon County | NC | MVO | razed 1776; rebuilt; removed 1819; extant; mound 2020 | | No-kwee-shee was destroyed by Rutherford; residents forced into the Qualla Boundary in 1819; a platform mound is the only extant feature left of the town. |
| Nayuhi | Nayowee | ᎾᏳᎯ | On the Valley River in Cherokee County, North Carolina | NC | MVO | abandoned | | There were several Lower Towns named 'Nayowee.' |
| Nununyi | Nuanha | ᏄᏄᎾᏱ | On the Oconaluftee River, near present-day Cherokee | NC | MVO | razed 1776; abandoned; extant; mound 2020 | | One of the seven mother towns of the Cherokee; destroyed by Rutherford; the main platform mound is still largely intact (2020); listed on the NRHP in 1980. |
| Spike Buck Town | Quanassee; Quanasi | ᏆᎾᏏ | Town developed around a mound along the Hiwassee River; today it is in downtown Hayesville | NC | | absorbed; extant; mound 2020 | | Listed on the NRHP and designated a memorial site in Veterans Recreational Park. |
| Sugar Town on the Cullasaja | Kulsetsi | ᎫᎳᏎᏥᏱ | Site on the Cullasaja River and very near Nikwasi town) on the Little Tennessee River in Macon County | NC | MVO | abandoned | | One of several "Sugartowns;" satellite town of Nikwasi. |
| Little Hiwassee town | | | Near Hiwassee Village, Cherokee County | NC | MVO | abandoned; submerged c.1935 | The Bowl | Head man was The Bowl before its late 18th century abandonment; minor satellite town of Tomotla; flooded by the Lake Hiwassee reservoir impoundment |
| Tomotla | Tomahli; Tamali; Tomotli | ᏔᎹᎵ or ᏙᎼᏟ | Near Tomotla, Cherokee County | NC | MVO | abandoned 1715; colonized; abandoned; extinct | | The name "Tomotla" is from the historic Yamasee inhabitants before they were expelled by the Cherokee in 1715. The Cherokee periodically inhabited the town. |
| Too-Cowee | Cowee; Stecoah; Steecoy | ᏤᎪᎠ | Located on the Little Tennessee River, north of present-day Franklin, North Carolina, Macon County | NC | MVO | razed 1776; rebuilt c.1778; abandoned; extant; mound 2020 | | Badly damaged in late 1776 by the Rutherford Light Horse expedition; re-populated following the raid, but eventually abandoned |
| Ustalli | Ustaly; Oustanale | ᎤᏍᏔᎵ | On the upper Hiwassee River in Clay County | NC | MVO | razed 1788; abandoned | | Burned in a John Sevier raid in 1788. |
| Watauga village | Wattoogi; Watoge | ᏩᏚᎩ | Mound and village on the Little Tennessee near Franklin, Macon County | NC | MVO | razed 1776; abandoned 1776 | | |
| Brasstown | Echoee; Etchowee | ᎡᏦᏪ | Site is on Upper Brasstown Creek (tributary to the upper Hiwassee), somewhere near Brasstown, Oconee County | GA | MVO | abandoned | | One of several locations with the "Brasstown" name; this one is near Brasstown Bald. |
| Buffalo | Yunsayi | ᏴᎾᏌᏱ | Near Ringgold, Catoosa County | GA | LT-11 | est. c.1777; abandoned | | Founded by Dragging Canoe as part of the relocation of Cherokee away from white settlements. |
| Conasauga | Cunasagee | ᎫᎾᏌᎩ | Site is in Gilmer County | GA | LT | abandoned; extinct | | Now a ghost town. (Note: "Conasauga" is a name derived from the Cherokee language, meaning "grass".) |
| Coosawattee town | Kuswatiyi | ᎫᏌᏩᏘᏱ | | GA | LTK | abandoned | Tsali | "Old Coosa Place" |
| Chatuga | Head-of-Coosa | ᏣᏚᎦ or ᎢᏙᏩ | Rome, Floyd County | GA | LLT | removed 1838; lottery 1838; absorbed 1839 | (See Etowah New Towne) | Was a satellite village of, and built close to, Etowah New Towne; site holdings auctioned off to citizens of Georgia, in 1839, along with Etowah New Towne. De-populated by forced removal of Cherokee in 1838. |
| Estatoe | Ishtatohe | | Along the Savannah River | GA | LTK | rebuilt 1760s; abandoned c.1770 | | Reestablished after the old town was destroyed by Creek attack |
| Etowah New Towne | Hightower | ᎡᏙᏩ | Now Rome, Floyd County | GA | LLT | removed 1838; lottery 1838; absorbed 1839; extant; ruins | John Ross; The Ridge (after 1819) | Town site near the confluence of the Oostanaula and Etowah rivers, which forms the Coosa River (the "Head of the Coosa", Chatuga); site holdings auctioned to citizens of Georgia, 1839; de-populated by forced removal in 1838; the Battle of Hightower, the Last Battle of the Cherokee occurred here on October 17, 1793. |
| Etowah Old Towne | Old Hightower | ᎡᏙᏩ | On the north shore of the Etowah River near Cartersville, Bartow County | GA | LTK | razed 1793; abandoned 1793; extant; mound 2020 | | Site is across the Etowah (Hightower) River from the Etowah Indian Mounds. |
| Lookout Mountain town | Utsutigwayi; Stecoyee | ᎤᏧᏘᏆᏱ or ᏤᎪᏱ | Is now the site of Trenton, Dade County | GA | LT-5 | est. 1782; abandoned 1786; absorbed; extinct | Dick Justice | Established by Dragging Canoe; he died here in 1792. |
| Nacoochee | Nagutsi; Nagoochee | ᎾᎫᏥ | On the coastal plane; on the Chattahoochee River in White County | GA | LT | abandoned; extant; mound 2020 | | Sometimes called "Chota." (Note: The ancient indian settlement site, Nacoochee, was also called "Chota" for a time.) |
| New Town / New Echota | Ganasagi; Kanasaki | ᎦᎾᏌᎩ | Calhoun, Gordon County | GA | LLT | est. 1819; re-named 1825; removed 1830s; abandoned 1839; extant; ruins | Little Turkey; Black Fox; Charles R. Hicks | Capital of the Cherokee Nation in the Southeastern United States from founding as New Town (1819) until their forced removal in the 1830s; renamed 'New Echota' in 1825; site abuts historic site of former capital, Ustinali; de-populated by the Trail of Tears 1830s; vacant for over 100 years; now a state park. |
| Red Clay | Elawa'-Diyi | ᎡᎳᏬᏗᏱ | Now Red Clay, Whitfield County | GA | LLT | absorbed | | |
| Sugar town on the Toccoa | Connetoga; Kulsetsiyi | ᎫᎳᏎᏥᏱ | At the confluence of the Toccoa River and Sugar Creek, in Georgia | GA | LLT | abandoned | | One of several Cherokee settlements named "Sugartown". |
| Tugalo | Dugiluyi; Toogoloo; Toogalooh | ᏚᎩᎷᏱ | At junction of Tugalo River and Toccoa Creek near present-day Toccoa in Stephens County | GA | LTK | razed 1724; razed 1776; abandoned 1776; submerged 1959 | Good Warrior of Towglow | An ancient, abandoned Creek Indian town; re-settled by Cheokee, but attacked by the Creeks in 1724; burned by Pickens on August 10, 1776, following the Battle of Tugaloo; excavated 1956 by Dr. Joseph Caldwell before completion of Hartwell Dam; flooded by Lake Hartwell. |
| Turnip town | Ulunyi | ᎤᎷᎾᏱ | Seven miles from Rome, Floyd County | GA | LLT | abandoned; extinct | | |
| Ustinali | Oothacalooga; Oostanaula | ᎤᏍᏘᎾᎵ or ᎤᏍᏔᎾᎵ | Near Calhoun, Gordon County | GA | LT-11 | est. c.1777; abandoned; extant footprint | John Ridge; Major Ridge (1794–1819) | National Council meeting place (capital city) from 1809 to 1819; site abuts New Echota Town; The name, Ustinali, was sometimes used interchangeably with New Echota in reference to the home of the Cherokee National Council. |
| Brown's Village | | | On Brown's Creek, near Red Hill, Marshall County | AL | LLT | est. 1790; abandoned | Headman Richard Brown | |
| Coldwater | | | Near Muscle Shoals (Dagunohi), Colbert County; | AL | LLT | est. 1782; razed 1787 | Doublehead | Joint occupation by Chickamauga and Chickasaw; Doublehead's base of operations during the Cherokee–American wars; razed by James Robertson's Cumberland militia in 1787; then became site of Colbert's Ferry, the Tennessee River crossing-place of the Natchez Trace trail. |
| Coosada | Coosadi | ᎫᏌᏓ | In Coosada, Elmore County | AL | LLT | est. 1782; absorbed | | |
| Cornsilk Village | Unenudo | ᎤᏁᏄᏙ | On Cornsilk Pond, 1.5 miles south of Warrenton Marshall County | AL | LTT | est. 1790; abandoned | Corn Silk | |
| Creek Path town | Kusanunahi | ᎫᏌ ᏄᎾᎯ | Site is four miles southeast of Guntersville, Marshall County | AL | LLT | est. 1785; abandoned | Catharine Brown | Very Important regional Cherokee town with a population of 400–500; close to Browns Town. |
| Crow Town | Kagunyi | ᎧᎫᎾᏱ | Near Stevenson, Jackson County | AL | LT-5 | abandoned | | Sister-town of, and located near to, Running Water town |
| Littafulchee | Litafulche | ᎵᏔᏡᎳᏥ | Along Canoe Creek, Calhoun County | AL | X | est. 1782; abandoned | | Probably originally a Creek Indian town. |
| Tallaseehatche | | ᏔᎳᏏᎭᏥ | In Calhoun County | AL | X | abandoned | | Originally a Creek Indian or Chickasaw town. |
| Turkeytown | Gundigaduhunyi | ᎫᎾᏗᎦᏚᎱᎾᏱ | Near Centre, Cherokee County | AL | LT-11 | est. 1777; abandoned; extinct | Little Turkey; John Ross; Tahchee | "Turkey's Town" (Gun'-di'ga-duhun'yi) was named after the founder of the settlement, Chickamauga, Little Turkey, a war chief of Dragging Canoe's. At one point it stretched for about 25 miles along both banks of the Coosa, being the largest of the contemporary Cherokee towns; seat of the Lower Towns council after 1794, alternating with Willstown until 1809. |
| Willstown | Titsohili | ᏘᏦᎯᎵ | Near Fort Payne, DeKalb County | AL | LT-11 | est. 1777; abandoned; absorbed; extant footprint | John Watts | Seat of the Lower Towns council after 1794, alternating with Turkeytown until 1809; large settlement stretching from DeKalb to Etowah counties. |

* KEY: MVO: Middle/Valley/Out Towns; OH: Overhill Cherokee settlement; LT: Cherokee Lower Towns, divided as: LT-11: one of the 11 original Chickamauga lower towns (established 1776–1778 following the Rutherford and Williamson campaigns); LT-5: founded at the time of the establishment of the later five+ Chickamauga Lower Towns; LTK: the original Lower/Keowee Towns (including those of the Carolina Piedmont); LLT: Late Lower Towns (formed in or after the 1790s); X Non-Cherokee or shared-residence towns with the Creek or Chickasaw.

== See also ==
- The Valley River
