= Rucker's Bottom site =

Archaeological site in Georgia, US

- Periods: Paleoindian, Archaic, Woodland, Mississippian
- Cultures: Mississippian culture
- Location: Elbert County, Georgia, USA
- Region: Elbert County, Georgia

History
- Built: 11,000 BCE
- Abandoned: 1450 CE

Site notes
- Architectural style: Palisaded village
- Excavation dates: 1980-1982

The Rucker's Bottom site (9EB91) is an archaeological site in located on the upper Savannah River in Elbert County, Georgia.

== Site information ==
Excavated by a team of archaeologists under contract from the Atlanta Interagency Archaeological Services Division of the National Park Service during the construction of the Richard B. Russell Lake, the Rucker's Bottom site was occupied from the Paleoindian and Early Archaic periods through the late precontact Mississippian Period. The site, which spans 60,000 m², was discovered in 1970, with subsequent survey and testing in the late 1970s, followed by three field seasons of large scale excavation from 1980 to 1982. The site was destroyed by the construction of the Russell reservoir.

=== Archaic occupation ===
Paleoindian and Early Archaic deposits were examined through the excavation of a 160 square meter block, in 1x1m units. A Clovis point, and Hardaway Dalton, and some 28 side and corner-notched Early Archaic points were found. Later Archaic and Woodland deposits were subsequently examined through the excavation of a 256 square meter block, followed by removal of the plow zone over ca. 10,000 square meters of the site area, with exposed features mapped and a sample excavated.

=== Mississippian occupation ===
The Mississippian period occupation lasted continuously from 1200 to 1500 CE, although the structure of the village changed substantially over time, from an unfortified town to one surrounded by semicircular and later rectangular fortification lines. The excavations documented a large number of structures as well as a plaza at the center of the later towns, which were surrounded by stockade and ditch lines, each with several openings or entrances. There was one large public house fourteen meters in diameter, that shows similarities to historical accounts of public buildings or council houses. Several large rock filled pits were found in the plaza that likely supported marker posts, for displaying trophies, as part of areas used for games and other public ceremonies.

The stockade encircled the houses as well as the public spaces. On the north end of the site the stockade consisted of posts ca. 20 to 30 cm in diameter, with a ditch opened just beyond the row of posts. These stockades helped defend the community from attack.

The town was adjacent to a swampy area, possibly a swale or ox-bow lake, on one side and the Savannah River on the other. The location would have given the residents access to both swamp and riverine resources, as well as the nearby uplandss. Adding these resources to the maize agriculture that the residents practiced would have provided a varied diet.

Over the several hundred year Mississippian period occupation the site changed significantly, from an open scatter of buildings to progressively more formally laid out communities. By the end of the occupation the residences were laid in a rectangular layout around a public square, surrounded by fortifications. The villages were abandoned about A.D. 1450, although no sign of warfare or burning was observed, suggesting the inhabitants may have moved away.

== See also ==
- List of Mississippian sites
- Dyar site
- Joe Bell site
- Pisgah phase
- Summerour Mound site
