= Neitzel =

Neitzel is a surname. Notable people with the surname include:

- Charles Neitzel (1853–1938), American farmer and politician
- Drew Neitzel (born 1985), American professional basketball player
- Enrico Neitzel (born 1977), German football striker
- Karl Neitzel (1901–1966), German U-boat commander in World War II
- Karsten Neitzel (born 1967), German footballer and manager
- Otto Neitzel (1852–1920), German composer and pianist, music writer
- Robert S. Neitzel (1911–1980), American archaeologist
- Rüdiger Neitzel (born 1963), West German handball player
- Sönke Neitzel (born 1968), German historian
- Tyler Neitzel (born 1991), American actor

== See also ==
- Vila Neitzel, geographical district in the Brazilian municipality of Itueta, founded by Pomeranians
