= Nununyi =

Ancient Cherokee town and United States national historic site

- Cultures: South Appalachian Mississippian culture, historic period Cherokee
- Location: Swain County, North Carolina, US
- Region: Swain County, North Carolina

Site notes
- Architectural styles: platform mound Number of temples:
- Nununyi Mound and Village Site
- U.S. National Register of Historic Places
- Area: 44 acres (18 ha)
- NRHP reference No.: 80002901
- Added to NRHP: January 22, 1980

Nununyi (or Nuanha) was a historic village of the Cherokee people in western North Carolina, located on the eastern side of the Oconaluftee River. Today it is within the boundaries of the present-day city of Cherokee in Swain County. It was classified by English traders and colonists as among the "Out Towns" of the Cherokee in this area east of the Appalachian Mountains.

The archeological site of "Nununyi Mound and Village Site," which contains evidence of Mississippian culture-period and historic Cherokee occupancy, was added to the National Register of Historic Places in 1980.

== Site location ==
The archeological site of "Nununyi Mound and Village" is located on the east side of the Oconaluftee River, in the bottomland, in modern Cherokee, North Carolina. The site was listed on the National Register of Historic Places as an archaeological site in 1980.

== History ==
Nununyi is believed to have been one of oldest of the Cherokee communities and was established on the Oconaluftee River. As was common in these foothill areas, it developed around a single earthwork platform mound, believed to have been constructed by people of the South Appalachian Mississippian culture. There was also a village then, likely also developed about 1000 CE. As with many sites throughout this area, there were likely earlier indigenous cultures here as well. This part of the Southeast was occupied by 8000 - 1000 BC.

When the Cherokee developed their historic town here, they constructed a townhouse on top of the earthwork mound; it was their form of public architecture. The townhouse was a place for the whole community to gather, more egalitarian than the society that built the mounds and elite residences. when it needed to be replaced, it would be taken down and burned, with a layer of soil added. Another townhouse would be built on top. These actions gradually increased the diameter of the mound.

American botanist William Bartram included Nununyi among the 43 Cherokee towns he identified in May 1776, spelling it "Nuanha" in his account. He noted that all the towns had people living in them.

During the American Revolutionary War, the colonies of Virginia, North and South Carolina, and Georgia mounted an offensive against the Cherokee in all their towns because they had allied with the British. They ordered General Griffith Rutherford, General of the Salisbury District, to undertake this offensive in September 1776. As part of the Rutherford Light Horse expedition, militia under the command of Colonel William Moore attacked Nununyi, Too-Cowee, and the Out Towns later that fall. The devastation caused by these militias was noted by James Mooney, in his 1900 history of the Cherokee and their culture.

After the war, in 1790 the Oconaluftee River was sometimes referred on state land grants to veterans as the "Nunai" river, likely a transliteration of Nununyi. Earlier alternate spellings on maps include "Newni", as shown on both George Hunter's Map (1730) and Thomas Kitchin's Map (1760, London).

== Current status ==
The main platform mound is still largely intact, although the Valentine brothers conducted amateur excavations here in 1883 while seeking artifacts for their father's museum in Richmond, Virginia. In 1950, the mound was identified as being about one mile upriver of Cherokee, which in the 21st century has expanded to it. It is on the eastern side of the Oconaluftee River, and in an area of bottomland of 65 to 70 acres. The Valentines identified an associated clay pit (borrow pit) about 800 feet from the mound.

In the late 20th century, the mound and former town site were classified by the state as an archeological site, under National Park Service standards. The combined site was listed on the National Register of Historic Places in 1980. The Cherokee High School was constructed near this site. Outer areas of the archeological site have been damaged by development.

== See also ==
- Nikwasi
- List of Mississippian sites
- National Register of Historic Places listings in Swain County, North Carolina
