= Rembert Mounds =

Archaeological site in Elbert County, Georgia, US

- Location within Georgia
- 33°59′45.6″N 82°35′9.6″W
- Cultures: Mississippian culture
- Location: Elbert County, Georgia, US
- Region: Elbert County, Georgia

Site notes
- Architectural style: platform mound

The Rembert Mounds (9EB1) is an archaeological site in Elbert County, Georgia in the area that is now under the Clark Hill Reservoir on the Savannah River. The last excavation of the site occurred just before the reservoir was built; Joe Caldwell and Carl F. Miller conducted the excavation during a three-week period between January 12 and June 1, 1948. However, they are not the first people to examine the site. William Bartram first described the mounds in 1773 as: "an imposing group of one large and several smaller mounds standing adjacent to some extensive structures [which he called tetragon terraces]." In 1848, George White claimed "the smaller mounds had been nearly destroyed." Then, Charles C. Jones, Jr. stated that "only traces of the smaller mounds remained and the tetragon terraces were no more than gentle elevations." Less than 10 years later, in 1886, John P. Rogan excavated part of the site under Cyrus Thomas and found only the largest mound and one of the smaller mounds still standing. Rogan's excavation was the last before Caldwell and Miller's excavation in 1948. However, there was a flood in 1908 that almost completely destroyed the large mound.

Caldwell and Miller excavated five test pits in and around the large mound and six pits in the adjacent village area. The excavations yielded animal remains and pottery sherds; it also provided good cross sections of strata. Most of the decorated pottery was classified as Lamar Complicated Stamped Pottery, which dates from A.D. 1450 to A.D. 1650. These findings suggest that the mound and village were mainly occupied during one period. However, other pottery sherds indicate sporadic occupation in earlier times. Other pottery found at the site includes Lamar Plain Pottery and Lamar Bold Incised Pottery; both of these pottery types were made at the same time as Lamar Complicated Stamped Pottery. There is far more undecorated, or Lamar Plain, pottery at the site then is usually present at similar sites dating to the same period.

Caldwell reported the dimensions of the large mound in 1948 as being 118 by 35 ft and 4 ft high. In contrast, in 1773 Bartram estimated the dimensions of the mound as 40 or 50 ft high with the base having a circumference of 200 or 300 yards. Caldwell also noted that the mound, which was within 130 feet of the river, sustained damage as result of its proximity to the river; the mound had been washed out in places along the edges. Caldwell and Miller agree with earlier descriptions that the large mound was a circular, flat-topped mound. In the 1886 excavation, Thomas reported that the small mound was 58 ft long, 41 ft wide, and 6 ft high. Caldwell also agrees with earlier assertions that the Rembert Mounds were surrounded by a fair size village, although there was very little surface evidence at the time of the excavation in 1948.

== See also ==
- List of Mississippian sites
- Dyar site
- Joe Bell site
- Pisgah phase
