= Joseph Caldwell (disambiguation) =

Joseph Caldwell (1773–1835) was an American mathematician.

Joseph or Joe Caldwell may also refer to:

- Joseph Pearson Caldwell (1808–1853), American representative from North Carolina
- Joe Caldwell (born 1941), American basketball player
- Joe Caldwell (archaeologist) (1916–1973), American archaeologist
