= Treaty of Dewitt's Corner =

1777 treaty which ended an initial wave of Overhill Cherokee town attacks

The Treaty of Dewitts Corner ended the initial Overhill Cherokee targeted attacks on colonial settlements that took place at the beginning of the American Revolution. A peace document signed by the Cherokee and South Carolina, the treaty instead laid the foundation for the decades long Cherokee–American wars fought between the European-Americans and the Chickamauga Cherokee people.

== Background ==
In 1773 the Treaty of Augusta, which was initiated at the request of both Cherokee and Creek Indians, ceded more than 2,000,000 tribal acres in Georgia to relieve Indian indebtedness to white traders. In 1775 the Overhill Cherokee had been persuaded at the Treaty of Sycamore Shoals to sell an enormous tract of land in central Kentucke to settlers from the colonies; specifically, the Transylvania Land Company operating out of the Province of Virginia. Although these agreements violated British law, they nevertheless became the basis for a colonial takeover of those areas.

== Unexpected attacks ==
Feeling threatened by colonial encroachment upon their hunting grounds, the Cherokee joined with tribes from the north (the Shawnee, Delaware, and Mohawk) in the Spring and Summer of 1776 to raid frontier settlements in North Carolina, South Carolina, Georgia, and Virginia in an effort to push settlers from their lands.

By July 1776, Chiefs Dragging Canoe, The Raven, and Ostenaco had gathered a force of 600-700 Cherokee warriors, who attacked Eaton's station, Ft. Watauga, and Carter's Valley in surprise, coordinated actions. These assaults failed. The raids were part of a series of attacks perpetrated by Cherokee and their northern allies; as well as their southern Muscogee and Choctaw allies on all the "over mountain" settlements (colonial enclave settlements located west of the Appalachian Mountains). The frontier-wide attacks, however, elicited a vigorous response from both militia and regulars from the southern colonies, which largely took place during September and October of that year.

== Colonial response ==
Major Colonel Andrew Williamson led a large force of South Carolina Continental Army troops and militia on an expedition against the Indians, destroying most of their towns east of the mountains, and then joined with the North Carolina militia (including Colonels Joseph Hardin and Francis Locke), to do the same in that state, taking part in the coordinated attack which later became known as the Rutherford Light Horse expedition, at the end of which Cherokee regional power was broken; their crops and villages destroyed; and their warriors largely dispersed.

"In May 1777 a delegation of roughly 600 Cherokee and representatives from South Carolina and Georgia met near this spot to engage in negotiations that would end fighting in the Second Cherokee war, 1776-1777. On May 20, 1777 the parties signed the Treaty of DeWitt's Corner, which provided for an end to hostilities, prisoner returns, and large land concessions by the Lower Cherokee...

[Historic monument] Erected 2015 by Abbeville County Visitor's Council."

== The treaty ==
Defeated in skirmishes and with their towns in ruins, most of the Cherokee town leaders thereafter sought peace. Several Beloved Men traveled to Charleston to negotiate a peace. In May 1777, Colonel Williamson led a South Carolina delegation to Dewitt’s Corner, near present-day Due West in Abbeville County to settle the requested peace terms. Georgia also sent delegates. As a result of the treaty negotiations, the Cherokee were forced to surrender vast tracts of territory in North Carolina and South Carolina.

The Treaty of Dewitt’s Corner differed from previous Cherokee treaties, in that this time, South Carolina dictated its terms to an enemy defeated in combat. The victorious colonials set a boundary line between South Carolina and the Cherokee running along the crest of Oconee Mountain, and mandated that American law had precedence over Cherokee law in dealings between the two peoples. The Cherokee lost nearly all of their land in South Carolina. Most of present-day Anderson, Greenville, Oconee, and Pickens Counties comprise lands given up by the Indians in the treaties. In return, South Carolina pledged to regulate trade and travel moving into and out of the remaining Cherokee territories in their jurisdiction.

== Aftermath ==
By the end of 1776, the majority of the Cherokee people wished to make peace with the American colonists. Following the signing of the Treaty of Dewitt's Corner, Dragging Canoe and his large group of followers moved further down the Tennessee River away from the historic Overhill settlements in order to resist the colonials from a more secure position. They settled in the Chickamauga Creek area (near present-day Chattanooga), an association which caused them for a time to be referred to as the "Chickamauga Cherokee."
