= Summerour Mound site =

Archaeological site

- Periods: Late Woodland period to Early Mississippian Woodstock Phase
- Cultures: Mississippian culture
- Location: Forsyth County, Georgia, USA
- Region: Forsyth County, Georgia

Site notes
- Architectural style: platform mound
- Excavation dates: 1951-1954

The Summerour Mound site (9FO16) is an archaeological site located in Forsyth County, Georgia. It was formerly on a floodplain of the west bank of the Chattahoochee River in northern Georgia. It is now flooded under the Buford Reservoir, also known as Lake Lanier.

This mound site, previously unreported, was discovered and excavated in 1951–54 by Joseph Caldwell in association with a Smithsonian Institution River Survey. He described the platform mound at the site as "considerably spread out in cultivation and ... now an oval, with a nearly level summit plateau about 225 feet (69 m) long, 150 feet (46 m) wide, and 9 feet (2.7 m) high." Caldwell found a temple or other public structure on the mound summit. It was rectangular, 18.5 feet (5.6 m) long by 16 feet (4.9 m) wide, the outer walls constructed of small posts set in wall trenches.

The mound was originally classified as Early Mississippian culture. Materials and records related to the mound have been restudied and the consensus is that it was likely earlier, part of the Late Woodland period.

== Description ==
Located on the west bank of the upper Chattahoochee River, where the valley is constricted, Summerour Mound was likely sited on an east-west indigenous trail. Nearby were remains of a village and sites associated with later historic Cherokee people and an early prehistoric scatter site. The Summerour site was located about midway in the 32.2 km between the headwaters of the Oconee River and the main channel of the Etowah River. It was likely integral to northern Georgia prehistory.

The mound was discovered by Joe Caldwell in 1951, as part of a project to survey the area prior to the construction of a dam to create the Buford Reservoir (now known as Lake Lanier). He undertook excavations with a team in the next few years. They found the mound summit was uncapped and a structure was added to the top. This type construction has been revealed as typical of several other Late Woodland mounds in the region.

Another type of capped mound has been found to be more typical of Middle Woodland period structures in the region, and also associated with burial or funerary practices.

In 1954 Clemens de Baillou conducted some excavations here, but was chiefly concerned with the historic Cherokee Vann Tavern, which was relocated to New Echota to preserve it. (De Baillou later directed the Augusta Museum of History (1964–1977).) Other professional work was led by archeologist Arthur R. Kelly and students in 1958. They left little documentation. More detailed assessments of Summerour Mound has largely relied on Caldwell's notes, drawings and unpublished work held by the University of Georgia.

== Dating of the mound ==
The mound's chronology has been debated in the decades since Caldwell placed it in the Early Mississippian Woodstock phase. He did qualify this conclusion and also suggested that ceramics from three periods may have been in use at the same time at the site. His classification was simplified by later scholars who tended to refer to the mound as constructed in the "Woodstock" period.

Dating of cultures in the Southeast has been refined, with considerable work on Woodland and Mississippian periods. In addition, after further examination of records and data, later archaeologists have argued for classifying the mound as a Late Woodland period construction, which preceded the Mississippian. This was based in part on the several styles of Native American pottery sherds found at the site, including B-complex Swift Creek, Napier Complicated Stamped, and plain pottery. These are more typical of the Woodland period. In addition, remains of the feature on the mound were radio carbon-dated, to AD 705-1020 at 2-sigma probability or AD 800-985 at 1-sigma probability, or Late Woodland.

== See also ==
- List of Mississippian sites
- Dyar site
- Joe Bell site
- Kenimer site
- Pisgah phase
