= Cowee Gap =

- Location within North Carolina
- Elevation: 4,199 feet (1,280 m)
- Traversed by: US 64

Third Approach
- Location: North Carolina; United States
- Range: Cowee Mountains
- Coordinates: 35°05′27″N 83°08′52″W
- Topo map: USGS Highlands

Cowee Gap (el. 4,199 ft (1,280 m)) is a mountain pass located between Highlands and Cashiers in the far southern part of western North Carolina. It is located on the Eastern Continental Divide, which also forms the boundary between Macon and Jackson counties, and between the Cullasaja River and Chattooga River basins (in turn part of the much larger Tennessee and Savannah basins) to the west and east, respectively.

It is traversed by U.S. Route 64 at a sharp switchback, at and just north of which can be seen Whiteside Mountain to the southeast. The road is known as Cashiers Road toward Highlands and as Highlands Road toward Cashiers, changing names at the gap due to the county line.

Historically, the Battle of Cowee Gap, between early settlers and the Cherokee people, was fought in the vicinity.
