= Robert S. Neitzel =

American archaeologist

Robert Stuart Neitzel was an archaeologist born on May 6, 1911, in Falls City, Nebraska, and died in 1980. He was married to Gwen Thomas in 1941 and they had two children, Sarah Cain and Stuart Allen. His parents were Robert Allen Neitzel and Hannah Sayre Meker Cain.

== Early life ==
Neitzel's father ran a five-and-dime store which Stuart would often work in throughout his childhood. In 1929, Stuart went off to the University of Nebraska where he studied medicine in hopes of becoming a doctor. When his sophomore year came, Stuart realized he did not want to be a doctor, but was merely fulfilling his parents’ wishes, so he decided to become a physical anthropology major. His flunking of chemistry also influenced this decision to change his major.

== Early career ==
Neitzel conducted his first fieldwork in 1933 as a physical anthropologist charged with identifying bones on a high bluff overlooking the Missouri Valley. He met some University of Chicago graduate students and was invited to attend the university. From 1934-1935 he attended the university, but he had to return to the University of Nebraska for financial and academic shortcomings. He immediately got back to work and went to middle Tennessee to work on the Mound Bottom and Pack sites from 1936 to 1937 for the University of Tennessee. In 1938 he met lifelong friend James A. Ford and traveled to Louisiana with him where they both worked on the Greenhouse site, Baptiste site and Marksville Prehistoric Indian Site. These three sites were instrumental in defining the chronology for the Lower Mississippi Valley. While working here he met his future wife Gwen Thomas.

== World War II ==
From 1941-1951 World War II caused archaeological work to cease for Stuart, but he did attempt to join the military multiple times. He was denied every time for various reasons, but he was able to learn how to read topographical maps through his sparse experience with the military. During this time he ran a dairy farm with the help of his wife and kids.

== Late career ==
In 1954 he became the curator of the museum at the Marksville site, but was replaced in 1957. He then went on a series of archaeological projects starting with the survey of the Ouachita River for Phil Philips. He then worked at the Menard–Hodges site on the Arkansas River, the Holly Bluff site in the Yazoo Basin and the Chauga Mound site for Arthur Kelley. He also moved to Cartersville, Georgia, to install a few Etowah Exhibits designed by Lew Larson. In 1960, he accepted the job of Curator of the State Historical Museum in Jackson, Mississippi. For four months in 1962, and again later in 1972, he worked on perhaps his most important site, the Fatherland or Grand Village of the Natchez site. This site contains mounds and was the political and social focal point of the Natchez people. He worked as the curator of the State Historical Museum until 1966, after which he continued to do archaeological work throughout the southeast even though he had officially retired in 1966.
