= Great Hiwassee =

Overhill Cherokee settlement

Coordinates: 35.24085°N 84.56361°W

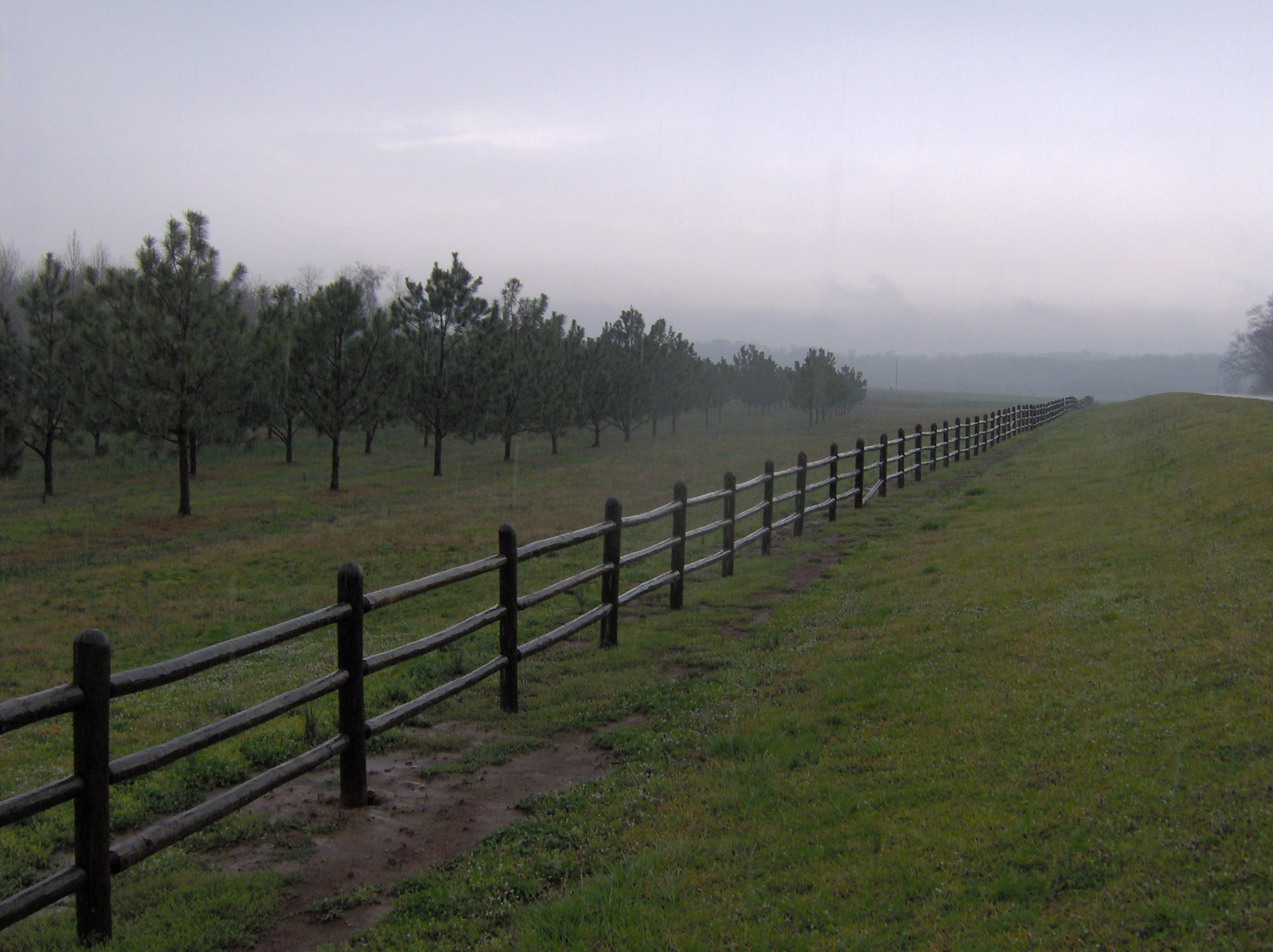
The site of Great Hiwassee

Great Hiwassee (Cherokee: ᎠᏴᏩᏏ ᎢᏆᎭ, romanized: Ayvwasi Egwaha) was an important Overhill settlement from the late 17th through the early 19th centuries. It was located on the Hiwassee River in present-day Polk County, Tennessee, on the north bank of the river where modern U.S. Route 411 crosses the river. The site is now part of the Tennessee Forestry Division's East Tennessee Nursery.

The town was linked to Great Tellico and Chota to the north, via the Great Indian Warpath, which followed Conasauga Creek into the mountains. The path was heavily used by the Overhill Cherokee.
