= Cowee–West's Mill Historic District =

Historic district in North Carolina, United States

- U.S. National Register of Historic Places
- U.S. Historic district
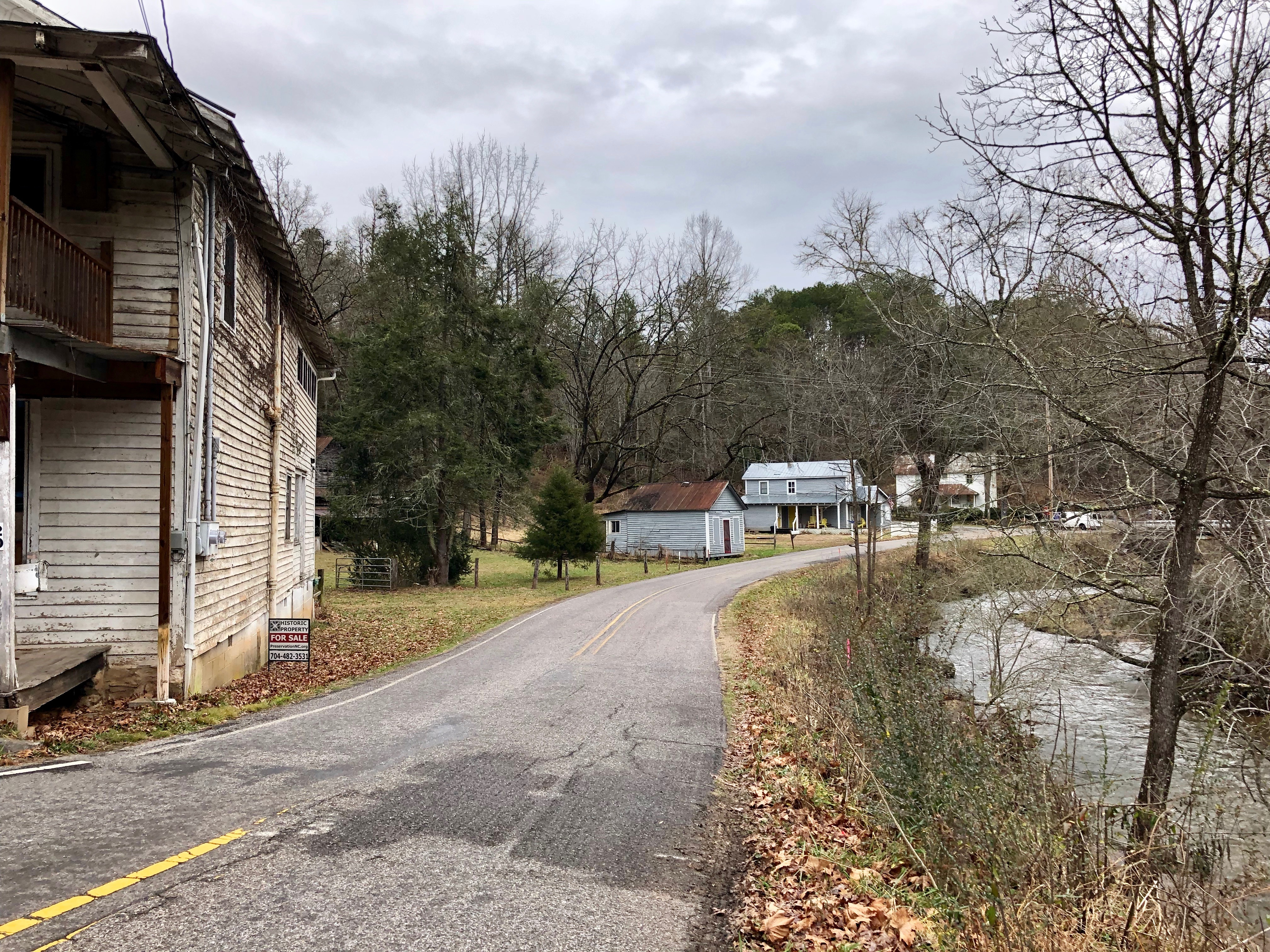
- West's Mill Road, January 2019

- Location within North Carolina Location within the United States
- Nearest city: Franklin, North Carolina
- Coordinates: 35°15′45″N 83°24′33″W
- Area: 369 acres (149 ha)
- Built: 1775
- Architectural style: Bungalow/craftsman, Art Deco, et.al.
- MPS: Macon County MPS
- NRHP reference No.: 00001569
- Added to NRHP: January 8, 2001

The Cowee–West's Mill Historic District encompasses an area of Macon County, North Carolina, which has historic significance predating the arrival of European settlers, and extending into the 20th century. It is located about 6 miles (9.7 km) north of Franklin, the county seat, along either side of Cowee Creek as it flows toward the Little Tennessee River. The district includes the archaeological site and platform mound of the Cherokee town of Cowee, a major settlement until the time of the American Revolutionary War. In the first half of the 19th century the area was developed as a mining community centered on a mill operated by the West family, and after the American Civil War it became one of a small number of rural African-American communities in western North Carolina. The core of the West's Mill area is centered on the junctions of SR 1350, SR 1341, SR 1340, and West's Mill Road, and North Carolina Route 28 is the major road passing through the district. Its northern and southern bounds are roughly where the valley floor gives way to hills on either side of Cowee Creek, ending in the west at Hall Mountain and in the east at the mouth of Caler Creek.

== See also ==
- National Register of Historic Places listings in Macon County, North Carolina
