= Sugartown =

Name of three different Cherokee towns

Sugartown was the name of at least three Cherokee towns. In Cherokee, the name was Kulsetsiyi (Syllabary: ᎫᎳᏎᏥᏱ),meaning "honey-locust place" from "kulsetsi" (honey-locust) and "yi" (locative). The word "kulsetsi" came to be used for "sugar" as well, thus the town name was often rendered "Sugartown" by the English colonists. One Sugartown was located on the Keowee River near Fall Creek, close to present-day Salem, South Carolina. It was just upriver from the principal "Lower Town" of Keowee. A second Sugartown was located on the Cullasaja River close to the mouth of Ellijay Creek, near present-day Franklin, North Carolina. The Cullasaja River's name is a rendering of "Kulsetsi". This Sugartown was near the principal "Middle Town" of Nikwasi. A third Sugartown was located on Sugar Creek, a tributary of the Taccoa River, near the present-day city of Blue Ridge, Georgia.

Several other locations also bear this name. Two unincorporated communities are known by this appellation. One Sugartown is in Chester County, Pennsylvania, and another Sugartown is located in Beauregard Parish, Louisiana.
