= Chauga Mound =

Archaeological site

- Location within South Carolina today
- 34°36′30.42″N 83°10′0.34″W
- Periods: Jarett Phase (1100 to 1200); Tugalo Phase (1500 to 1600)
- Cultures: South Appalachian Mississippian culture
- Location: Westminster, South Carolina, Oconee County, South Carolina, USA
- Region: Oconee County, South Carolina

History
- Built: Middle Archaic
- Abandoned: 18th century

Site notes
- Architectural styles: platform mound, plaza
- Excavation dates: 1953, 1958, 1959
- Archaeologists: Joseph R. Caldwell, Carl Miller, Arthur R. Kelly, Robert S. Neitzel

The Chauga Mound (38OC1) is an archaeological site once located on the northern bank of the Tugaloo River, about 1,200 feet (370 m) north of the mouth of the Chauga River in present-day Oconee County, South Carolina. The earthen platform mound and former village site were inundated by creation of Lake Hartwell after construction of the Hartwell Dam on the Savannah River, which was completed in 1962.

While the site was found to have been occupied in the Middle Archaic era, the platform mound and village portion of the site were built in the twelfth century by peoples of the South Appalachian Mississippian culture (a regional expression of the Mississippian culture). The village was abandoned for a period in prehistory, and then reoccupied in the sixteenth century.

It may have been occupied by the historic Cherokee in the last and fourth phase, as they were known to have a historic village named Chauga. Evidence dates their occupancy into the early eighteenth century. The Cherokee had their homeland in a large area of what are now known as western Virginia, western North and South Carolina, northeastern Georgia, and eastern Tennessee.

== Site description ==
The site consists of an earthen platform mound and village that was developed on a natural levee about 100 feet (30 m) from the Tugaloo River, 1,200 feet (370 m) north of its confluence with the Chauga River.

=== Site chronology ===
Four distinct periods of archeological occupation have been identified. The first period occurred during the Middle Archaic, as indicated by quartz and some scattered campsites. Phase two encompasses the first six levels of the mound and dates to the Jarett Phase (1100 to 1200), a local variation of the Etowah Culture. A study of archeological evidence has shown that the site was abandoned for a period in pre-history and reoccupied in the sixteenth century. The third phase encompasses the final four stages of the mound construction and dates to the Tugalo Phase (1500 to 1600), a local manifestation of the Lamar phase. The platform mound indicates that it was an administrative and ceremonial center for chiefdoms of these two periods.

The final and fourth period of occupation of the site dates from the Estatoe Phase to the early 18th century. It is associated with the historic Cherokee because of pottery deposits. They are an Iroquoian-speaking people who are believed to have migrated into this area from the north around the Great Lakes. According to Hally, the evidence is not conclusive for this site being identified as the historic Cherokee village of Chauga, as there are no contemporary maps showing that village's location.

=== Mound ===
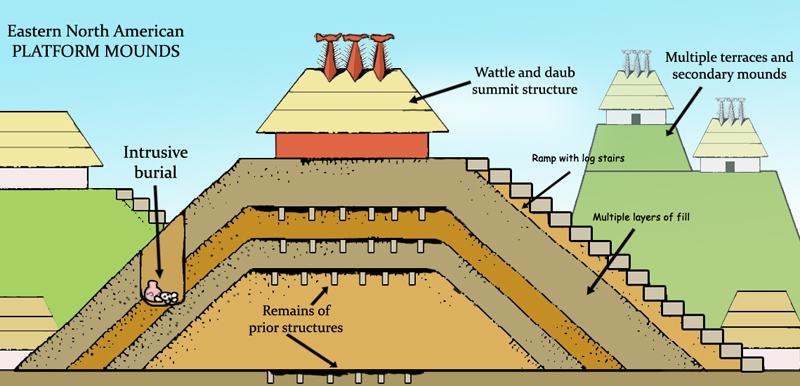
Diagram showing mound construction sequence

Originally standing about 12 feet (3.7 m) in height and 115 feet (35 m) across in diameter at the base, the platform mound was constructed in 10 stages. Extensive damage has taken place from erosion and amateur digging. As a result, only the first four stages are left with distinguishable form and purpose, and the height of the mound was reduced to 8 feet (2.4 m).

Stage 1 of the mound began as a low, truncated, rectangular pyramid about 2.2 feet (0.67 m) in height, which was probably used as a dance platform or dais. The fill for this mound came from the midden area of a previous Woodland period settlement; it was followed by a thinner, semi-impermeable, blue-grey clay cap.

Stages 2–6 follow the same pattern. The clay cap had a low rim and trough around the base of the mound and in some cases extended to as much as 10 feet (3.0 m) from the base of the mound. The nature of the impervious clay and the trough to carry away rainwater helped to protect the interior fill from erosion. The fill was carried to the mound by basket loads. At Stage 2 the mound was 45 feet (14 m) across at the base and with a summit roughly 25 feet (7.6 m) square and several feet higher than Stage 1. On top of this mound a structure was added. During these stages, smooth boulders from the river were incorporated into the mound, possibly to help stabilize the shape.

Stages 7–10 did not have the clay cap feature. Mound construction appears to have occurred only on the southern and eastern sides of the mound. These stages may have been to add an apron-like extension or ramp to reach the main body of the mound.

=== Burials ===
There are more than sixty burials at the Chauga village site, and more than thirty burials within the mound. The mound contains artifacts ranging from stone tools, potsherds and ornaments made of shells, copper plates, and rocks and minerals. Many of these items were deposited as grave goods with the burials.

Among the artifacts found at the site is a 30 millimetres (1.2 in) steatite plate with an anthropo-zoomorphic human-headed, winged figure, of a style often associated with the Southeastern Ceremonial Complex. This was prevalent throughout the Southeast.

== Excavations ==
American archeologist Joseph R. Caldwell first excavated there in 1953. He was followed by Carl Miller in 1958. The most complete excavation took place under the leadership of Arthur R. Kelly and Robert S. Neitzel from August 1958 to January 1, 1959. Kelly and Nietzel performed salvage archaeology on the site in conjunction with the U.S. National Park Service while working at the University of Georgia. They hoped to salvage as many artifacts and as much information as possible before the Hartwell Basin flooded the site after construction of the Hartwell Dam on the Savannah River. The dam was completed in 1962.

== See also ==
- List of Mississippian sites
- Kenimer site
- Nacoochee Mound
- Nikwasi
