= Red Clay, Georgia =

Unincorporated community in Whitfield County, Georgia, US

- unincorporated community
- Location within Georgia
- Coordinates: 34°59′05″N 84°56′46″W
- Country: United States
- State: Georgia
- County: Whitfield
- Elevation: 827 ft (252 m)
- Time zone: UTC-5 (Eastern (EST))
  - Summer (DST): UTC-4 (EDT)
- ZIP code: 30710
- GNIS feature ID: 356488

Red Clay is an unincorporated community in Whitfield County, in the U.S. state of Georgia.

== History ==
Red Clay was the site of Cherokee Indian seasonal gatherings in the 1830s. The community's name is an accurate preservation of the native Cherokee-language name Elawa'-Diyi, meaning "Red-earth place". A post office called Red Clay was established in 1840, and remained in operation until 1905.
