= Joe Bell site =

Archaeological site in Morgan County, Georgia, US

- Location within Georgia
- 33°32′28.9″N 83°16′40.8″W
- Location: Morgan County, Georgia, United States
- Region: Morgan County, Georgia

Site notes
- Excavation dates: 1969

The Joe Bell site (9MG28) is an archaeological site located in Morgan County, Georgia, United States, underneath Lake Oconee, but prior to the 1970s, it was located south of the mouth of the Apalachee River on the western bank of the Oconee River. The junction of these two rivers could be seen from the site. This site was first visited by Marshall Williams in 1968 at the suggestion of the site’s landowner, Joe Bell, who had discovered various artifacts while the site was being regularly plowed. Because of Interstate construction, Marshall Williams and Mark Williams discovered this site during surface surveys and excavations of the plowed areas. The site was excavated and analyzed by Mark Williams as part of his PhD dissertation. During the 1969 excavations, four areas within the site were designated for excavation. In Areas 1-3 various five foot square units were excavated. No excavations were done in Area 4 in 1969. Large quantities of small potsherds were discovered during these excavations, and they ranged from the Duvall Phase in Area 1 to Bell Phase in Areas 2-4. As part of the 1969 excavations, a road grading machine took off the topsoil of twelve strips on the site. This uncovered Features 1 and 2, and they were completely excavated. In 1977, the site was revisited by Marshall Williams and Mark Williams. Since various plans threatened this site, major excavations took place from June 15, 1977 until September 16, 1977 by Mark Williams. Most of the work centered on Area 2 or the Bell Phase portion of the site. The Bell Phase portion of this site was probably no more the 1.5 acres (1 ha). Because of time constraints, only 17 of 55 features were excavated, and no more than a handful of the 1100 posts were excavated. A few trips were made back to the site the following year with the help of volunteers, and approximately 80% of the area stripped by heavy machinery was mapped. Some of the features were trash features that consisted of a circular pit filled with food residues and pottery sherds. Evidence of a large circular structure or rotunda was found at the site. It was the social, political, and religious center for the inhabitants. A large quantity of the features was small, circular, semi-subterranean structures that were probably used as sleeping quarters on cold nights. Another structure found was warm weather structures. One major trash feature was found that had been deposited in a single episode and was burned during or after deposition. Numerous sherds were found in this pit, and many reconstructable vessels were present. Ethnohistoric literature of the Southeast suggests that this feature was formed during a Busk or Green Corn ceremony. The ceremony has been described as the physical cleansing of the town.

== See also ==
- List of Mississippian sites
- Dyar site
- Kenimer site
- Rembert Mounds
- Summerour Mound site
