= Vila Neitzel =

Geographical district in Itueta, Brazil

Vila Neitzel is a geographical district in the Brazilian municipality of Itueta, founded by Pomeranians.

The district was founded by German refugees during World War II.

In the district is currently headquartered Língua Mutter project, which has the goal of teaching and spreading the East Pomeranian dialect among the inhabitants of the district.

== See also ==
- German Brazilians
