= Too-Cowee =

United States national historic site and former Cherokee town

- Cowee [Stecoah]
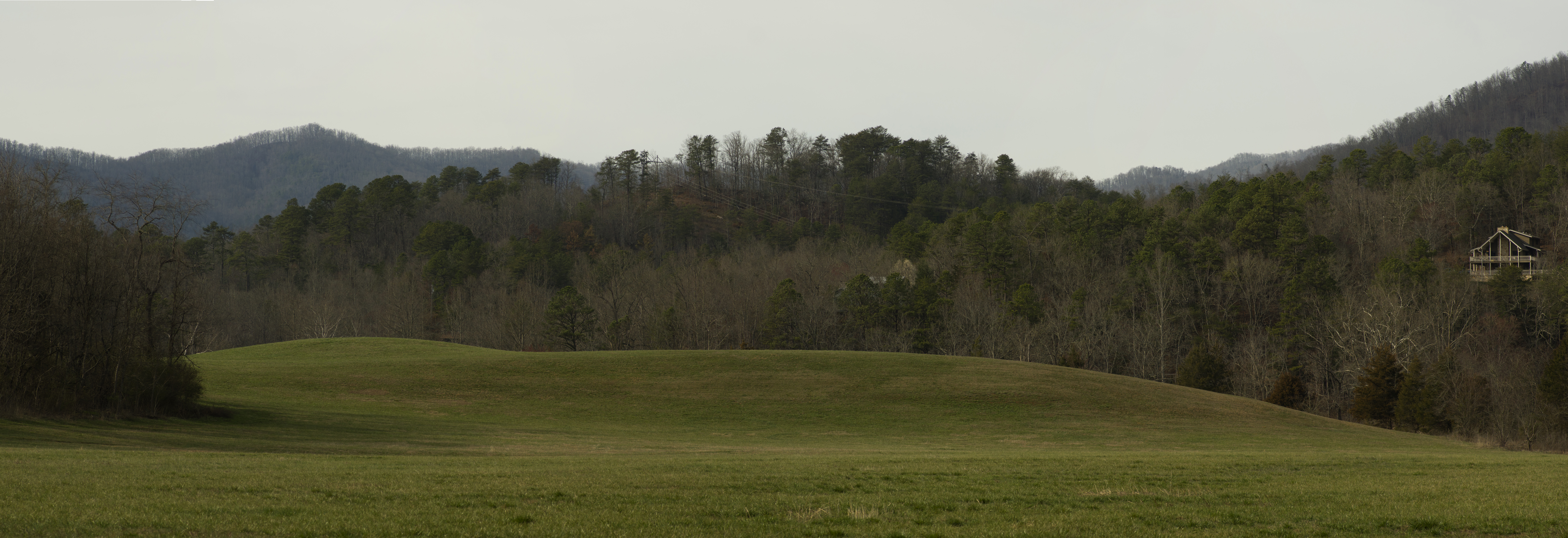
- Looking downriver across the Too-Cowee site.
- Interactive map of Too-Cowee
- 35°15′54″N 83°25′3″W
- Cultures: South Appalachian Mississippian culture, historic period Cherokee
- Region: Macon County, North Carolina

Site notes
- Architectural styles: platform mound Number of temples:
- Cowee Mound and Village Site
- U.S. National Register of Historic Places
- U.S. Historic district – Contributing property
- Area: 53 acres (21 ha)
- Part of: Cowee-West's Mill Historic District (ID00001569)
- NRHP reference No.: 73002238 (31Ma5)

Significant dates
- Added to NRHP: January 18, 1973
- Designated CP: January 8, 2001

Too-Cowee (sometimes Cowee) (also Stecoah), was an important historic Cherokee town located near the Little Tennessee River north of present-day Franklin, North Carolina. It also had a prehistoric platform mound and earlier village built by ancestral peoples. As their expression of public architecture, the Cherokee built a townhouse on top of the mound. It was the place for their community gatherings in their highly decentralized society. The name translates to "pig fat" in English. British traders and colonists referred to Cowee as one of the Cherokee Middle Towns along this river; they defined geographic groupings based in relation to their coastal settlements, such as Charlestown, South Carolina.

The "Cowee Mound and Village Site", now within present-day Macon County, North Carolina, has been listed since 1973 on the National Register of Historic Places as an archeological site. Since 2006 it has been owned by the federally recognized Eastern Band of Cherokee Indians, based in North Carolina, which shares some conservation easements with the state.

== Archeological site ==
Cowee was developed in the floodplain of the river, as were most prehistoric and historic indigenous towns. It has been described as one of the best-preserved South Appalachian Mississippian culture sites in western North Carolina and has an earthwork platform mound. The people of the South Appalachian Mississippian culture flourished in this area from about 1000 CE to the 14th or 15th century. It developed later in this region than in the main cultural centers in the Midwest.

In this period, the larger villages in South Appalachia each built a single platform mound. These villages each served as the political center for several nearby smaller communities. In the largest centers, by contrast, such as Cahokia and Etowah Indian Mounds, the Mississippian culture people gathered in larger centers and built multiple mounds. These dense settlements expressed the more stratified levels of social and political hierarchy.

The Too-Cowee mound and village site became an important center for the Cherokee, who occupied a large territory in southeastern Tennessee, western North and South Carolina, and northeastern Georgia. They are believed to have migrated from the Great Lakes area, where other Iroquoian-speaking peoples are based, and to have been in this homeland in the Southeast for more than 1,000 years.

When the Cherokee occupied this area, they built a large townhouse or council house on top of the mound, which was their form of public architecture. It held the sacred flame of the people. When needed, the townhouse would be dismantled and burned, then replaced, and the mound repaired. It gradually became larger in circumference. Large enough to hold hundreds of people, the townhouse was a place for the community to gather.

In the westernmost eleven counties of North Carolina, the Cherokee developed towns known by colonists in the eighteenth century as the Middle, Valley, and Out Towns, along the river valleys and floodplains between mountain ridges in this region. The major rivers were the French Broad, Pigeon, Tuckaseegee, Little Tennessee, and Hiwassee. In the late eighteenth century, the Cherokee expanded deeper to the south and west into Georgia and Alabama.

The Cowee Mound and Village Site has been defined as the mound and about 53 acres (21 ha) of rolling fields and hills, believed to contain evidence of the Cherokee village and earlier habitations. It was listed on the National Register of Historic Places in 1973 as an archaeological site. In 2001 it was listed as a contributing site to the "Cowee-West's Mill Historic District."

== History ==
British colonists attacked the village during the Anglo-Cherokee War, which accompanied the later years of the French and Indian War. During the American Revolutionary War, the Cherokee sided with the British, hoping to expel colonists from their territory. Cowee was attacked by colonial militia led by Colonel William Moore in November 1776. Most of the people had fled the village but, according to his account, the militia destroyed their houses, and looted their stored crops before attacking other towns.

During and after the revolution, other Cherokee bands fought a series of actions in the Chickamauga territory of southeastern Tennessee to evict encroaching European-American settlers.

After the Cherokee were forced to cede this territory in 1819 by a treaty with the United States, the mound and village site were abandoned for a time.

=== Ownership transfer ===
In 1838-1839 most of the Cherokee were removed from the Southeast to Indian Territory west of the Mississippi River. The European-American Hall family acquired property including this site in the 1840s. The Halls held the land for 175 years, and refused to allow private archaeological access to the main platform mound and former village area.

In 2002 Hall descendants began negotiations that culminated in the 2007 transfer of the mound and village site to the Eastern Band of Cherokee Indians (EBCI). Certain conservation and preservation easements are held by the state. The EBCI have also worked to acquire other important Cherokee sites in their historic homeland, such as Kituwa, their mother town, which they acquired in 1996. With a non-profit partner, they acquired the Cowee Mound and Village Site in 2006. The EBCI are descended from Cherokee who remained in this area after removal, and they are the only federally recognized tribe in North Carolina.

By 2020 the EBCI and partners also succeeded in gaining control of Nikwasi and Watauga mounds, the visible remnants of once-large historic Cherokee and ancestral towns at these sites along the upper Little Tennessee River. They formed the non-profit Nikwasi Initiative and worked with Mainspring Conservation Trust to achieve this.

They are planning to highlight these three sites on the "Nikwasi Trail", a corridor to be highlighted along the Little Tennessee River. The tribe and local organizations are collaborating to develop this area for recreation, education, and heritage tourism related to these important sacred sites.

== See also ==
- Nikwasi
- List of Mississippian sites
- Chauga Mound
- Nacoochee Mound
- Kenimer site
