= Rutherford Light Horse expedition =

Punitive 1776 military excursion targeting Cherokee settlements

- Part of American Revolutionary War
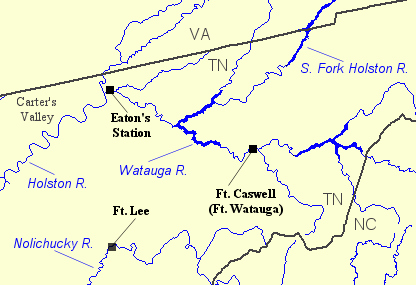
- Targets of the failed Cherokee invasion of the Washington District, 1776
Date	October 17 thru November 16, 1776
Location	Lower, Middle, and Overhill Cherokee settlements of the Washington District
Result	Patriot victory Treaty of Dewitt's Corner

Belligerents
(United States) Patriot militia	Cherokee

Commanders and leaders
Griffith Rutherford; William Moore; Joseph Hardin	Dragging Canoe; Ostenaco; Abraham of Chilhowee

Units involved
2nd Rowan County Regiment; Salisbury District Light Horse Cavalry	

Strength
97 cavalry	Unknown

The Rutherford Light Horse expedition was a punitive military excursion launched against the Lower, Middle, and Overhill Cherokee settlements of the Cherokee Indians in the Appalachian region of North Carolina. This was in retaliation for the Native Indian strikes made against the European American settlements of the Watauga Association in July 1776, in an early action of the American War of Independence. The expedition, which took place on the American frontier and resulted in the destruction of six Cherokee towns, ran from October 17 until November 16, 1776. The excursion only concluded when the troop was forced to turn back due to a lack of supplies. It was led by Captain William Moore of the 2nd Rowan County Regiment, acting directly under the command of Brigadier General Griffith Rutherford.

== Background ==
Shortly after the outbreak of the Revolutionary War (April 1775), the members of the Watauga Association organized themselves into the extra-legal "Washington District", a region "...loyal to the united colonies..." They promptly formed a Committee of Safety to oversee it. In the Spring of 1776, the Washington District Committee of Safety drafted a petition asking the Colony of Virginia to annex the district. After Virginia's refusal, a similar petition was drafted (July 5, 1776) asking the North Carolina Assembly to annex the area. Shortly thereafter, the Cherokee initiated a plan to drive the settlers, whom they viewed as trespassers, out of the area as a prelude to a planned invasion of Virginia. The first prong of the attack, led by Cherokee war chief, Dragging Canoe, was defeated by colonials at the Battle of Heaton's Station (aka 1776 Battle of Eaton's Station). The second prong, led by Abraham of Chilhowee, was routed at Fort Watauga. However, the third prong of the attack, led by The Raven, was successful in emptying the Carter Valley of settlers, at least temporarily.

In response to these attacks, several thousand Virginia militia (under General William Christian) attacked the Overhill towns, in what is today northeast Tennessee. The plan of attack was drawn in conjunction with a strategy which called for two thousand South Carolina militiamen (led by Major Andrew Williamson), as well as a small contingent from Georgia, to join up with the combined infantry and cavalry force from North Carolina (under General Rutherford). This united, southern army invaded the middle and lower Cherokee towns, and burned over 30 settlements, including the major towns of Tuskegee and Citico. The southern and northern forces, however, were unable to link up, due to a lack of supplies, and each group had returned home by mid to late September, 1776.

At the end of the late summer engagements, Rutherford's force consisted of 1971 "privates of foot" (down from an initial 2500), and about 80 "light horse" cavalry under Captain Moore.

== The Light Horse raid ==
Rutherford's cavalry commander, Moore, re-activated his cavalry troop on October 19, 1776. On the 29th, he met up (near Cathey's fort) with Captain Joseph Hardin, who had been active since August in raising a cavalry troop from Tryon County, then part of the Salisbury Military District in North Carolina. The next day the combined forces crossed into an area situated between the Swannanoa and French Broad Rivers, where they discovered fresh evidence of recent Indian activity.

"After the Moon arose we sent out a Detachment of 13 men Commanded by Capt Hard[i]n & Lieut Woods. They Continued their pursuit about 8 miles and Could Make no Discovery, Untill Daylight appear’d, then they Discovered upon the frost, that One Indian had gone Along the Road; they pursued Very Briskly about five miles further and came up with sd Indian, Killed and Scalped him." [sic] —Capt. Wm Moore

The cavalry quickly headed to the Cherokee town of Too Cowee, but having just a small army of 97 men at that point, found they could not surround the large, spread-out settlement, and opted for a direct raid instead. Charging into town, they found it almost entirely empty. They looted what food they could find, and torched the town. The chase of the main body of the fleeing Cherokee, however, then continued at a brisk pace, which at one point forced the fleeing natives to set fire to the forest to impede the progress of the pursuing cavalry. This conflict became known as the "Battle of Cowee Gap."

== Results ==
The expeditionary force destroyed an additional five Cherokee towns before being forced to retreat due to a lack of supplies. The majority of the Cherokee towns made peace shortly thereafter under the Treaty of Dewitt's Corner (1777). Dragging Canoe and Ostenaco refused to sign another treaty, and fled south with their followers, the Chickamauga Cherokee, to the creek which bears their name, in order to continue the armed struggle in what became known as the Cherokee–American wars, a decades long struggle which lasted until 1794.
