= Arthur Randolph Kelly =

American archaeologist

Arthur Randolph Kelly (October 27, 1900 – November 4, 1979) was an American professional archaeologist. He made numerous contributions to archeology in Georgia, which began with directing excavations at the Macon Plateau Site in 1933, part of the federal archeology program that provided jobs while undertaking studies of important sites. During his career, he also worked at the Etowah Mound and Village site, Lamar Mounds, the Lake Douglas Mound, the Oliver and Walter F. George River Basin surveys, the Estatoe Mound, the Chauga Mound, and the Bell Field Mound, among others in Georgia.

After completing his graduate education with master's and doctoral degrees at Harvard University, Kelly had a career spanning academic service, and professional excavations under the Smithsonian Institution and other organizations. He also directed operations at national monuments for the National Park Service and served as its chief archeologist for several years. In 1947 he was selected by University of Georgia to be founding chairman of a Department of Anthropology there, serving in that role until 1963, followed by several years as a professor.

== Early life and education ==
He was born in Hubbard, Texas, to Thomas Lucius Kelly and Mamye Lewis (Atwood) Kelly on October 27, 1900. He attended a public high school and earned his bachelor's degree in 1921 from the University of Texas. There he had become interested in the field of physical anthropology while taking classes under anthropologist G.C. Engerrand. The latter suggested that Kelly go to Harvard for graduate study under anthropologist Earnest Hooton. He earned his M.A. in anthropology in 1926 and his Ph.D. in 1929; both from Harvard.

== Career ==
From 1929 to 1933, Kelly taught as an Assistant Professor of Anthropology at the University of Illinois. While there he also worked on the Cahokia Mound site, the center of the Mississippian culture that influenced much of North America through the Ohio and Mississippi waterways and trade routes. He was let go from his position at the university due to the Great Depression.

Kelly was hired in 1933 by the Smithsonian Institution as director of excavations at the Macon Plateau Site near Macon, Georgia, on the Ocmulgee River. This was being explored as a part of the Federal relief archaeological program, which provided jobs to workers to help excavate the sites. The Smithsonian assigned James A. Ford as an assistant to Kelly.

While at Macon Plateau, Kelly was in charge of between 700 and 1000 Works Progress Administration laborers. On December 23, 1936, the National Park Service formally designated the Macon Plateau site as Ocmulgee National Monument. The same year Kelly was hired by the National Park Service as Superintendent of the Ocmulgee National Monument. (When the National Register of Historic Places was later established in the 1970s, this monument was added to it.)

In 1939 Kelly was promoted to chief archaeologist of the National Park Service, and served at NPS headquarters in Washington, D.C. In 1941 he was selected as superintendent of the Custom House National Monument in Salem, Massachusetts.

In 1943 Kelly returned to his former job as superintendent at Ocmulgee National Monument in Macon. In September 1947 he was invited by the University of Georgia to start a Department of Anthropology there and started full-time at the university.

Kelly served as founding Chairman of the Department of Anthropology at the University of Georgia from 1947 until 1963. He continued to serve as a professor there until 1969.

Kelly’s archaeological work in Georgia include the Etowah Mound and Village site, Lamar Mounds, the Lake Douglas Mound, the Oliver and Walter F. George River Basin surveys, the Estatoe Mound, the Chauga Mound, and the Bell Field Mound, among others.

Kelly and his wife, Rowana, had four daughters together: Sheila, Joanna, Patricia, and Cora Lewis.
