= Dyar site =

Archaeological site in Georgia, USA

- Location within Georgia today
- 33°35′35.95″N 83°16′15.6″W
- Periods: Lamar phase
- Cultures: South Appalachian Mississippian culture
- Location: Greensboro, Georgia, Greene County, Georgia, USA
- Region: Greene County, Georgia

History
- Built: 1100
- Abandoned: 1600

Site notes
- Architectural styles: platform mound, plaza Number of temples: 1
- Excavation dates: 1969
- Archaeologists: Chester DePratter

The Dyar site (9GE5) is an archaeological site in Greene County, Georgia, in the north central Piedmont physiographical region. The site covers an area of 2.5 hectares. It was inhabited almost continuously from 1100 to 1600 by a local variation of the Mississippian culture known as the South Appalachian Mississippian culture. Although submerged under Lake Oconee, the site is still important as one of the first explorations of a large Mississippian culture mound. The Dyar site is thought to have been one of the principal towns of either Ocute or Cofitachequi.

== Site description ==
The platform mound located at the site was described in 1975 as being in the shape of a truncated cone approximately 10.3 metres (34 ft) high and with a base 52 metres (171 ft) in diameter. On the eastern edge of the mound in the central area of the site was a plaza surrounded by domestic structures making up an oval shaped village of 2.13 hectares.

=== Mound ===
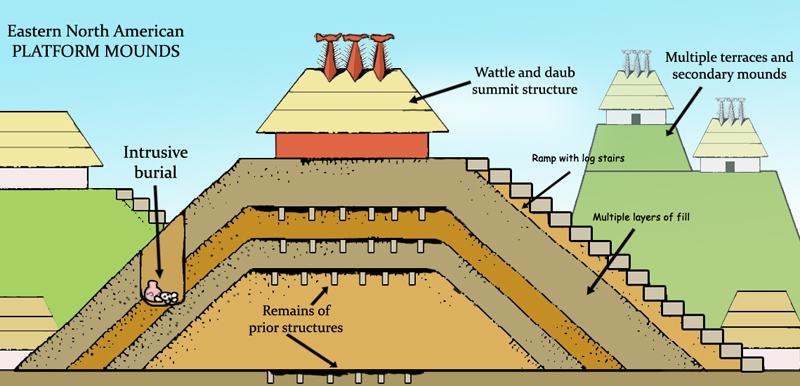
Diagram showing mound construction sequence

Platform mounds are built up in a series of stages that can span generations. The Dyar mound itself began during the Stillhouse Phase with a large civic structure with a sand floor and built with single set post construction. Over this a layer of 70 centimetres (28 in) thick blue-black clay was added. On top of this was added a 40 centimetres (16 in) layer of grey clay loam and on which another structure was added. Stillhouse Phase Etowah Complicated stamped pottery sherds were found at this layer. Stage II begins with another layer of 30 centimetres (12 in) grey clay loam added. Stages III, IV, V, and VI are in sequence 35 centimetres (14 in) of dark and then white clay, 45 centimetres (18 in) red and grey clay, 70 centimetres (28 in) of grey and tan clay, and 37 centimetres (15 in) of dark grey and reddish tan clay, each stage with its own structure. Stage VII consists of 25 centimetres (9.8 in) of grey and orange and 25 centimetres (9.8 in) of yellow clay. A step up on the western side of the summit indicates that this stage was the first to have multiple levels and multiple structures, possibly two large structures on the western side and a smaller one on the eastern side which was found to have had a burned floor. Stage VIII was a layer of brown clay 14 centimetres (5.5 in)to 20 centimetres (7.9 in) thick. The eastern side at this stage is 40 centimetres (16 in) lower than the western side and covered by a layer of construction debris thought to have come from the razing of an old structure on the western side. Stage IX is 80 centimetres (31 in) of brown and grey clay with the multiple levels continuing. Pottery sherds from this layer are thought to date from the Duvall Phase. Stage X is a thin 10 centimetres (3.9 in) layer of light grey clay followed by Stage XI which is another thick 57 centimetres (22 in) layer of gray and tan clay. Stage XI is thought to date from the Ironhorse Phase. All stages above this date to the Ironhorse and Dyar Phases. Stage XII is a 60 centimetres (24 in) layer of yellow and grey clay. The structure at the western side has a semi-subterranean floor cut into its surface, the first seen on the mound. At this stage the difference between the eastern and western levels is 40 centimetres (16 in) to 50 centimetres (20 in). Stage XIII was a layer 62 centimetres (24 in) of yellow-orange and grey clay. The eastern level has a 10 centimetres (3.9 in) to 18 centimetres (7.1 in) cap of yellow clay. This stage and Stage XIV, an indeterminate layer of gray sandy clay, were not found to have structures. It is not known if they did not have structures at this time or if the evidence for these structures or subsequent layers has been lost.

=== Mound structures ===
The western level from stages VII to XIII had two large structures with specially prepared clay floors that were kept meticulously clean. The floors on these structures was very deeply entrenched into the mound. This feature was noted by the first European observers of the mound. Without the structures over them, they assumed the deep enclosures were walls. The two structures may at times have been connected by a passageway, although this is not certain. It is also not certain if all stages had both structures. These structures were also rebuilt multiple times during the last phases of construction, more often than the layers of new mound fill were added. The function of northwestern of the two cannot be determined, but the southwestern structure has archaeological remains relating to ritual activities such as the sacred fire and the black drink ceremony. The final structure at the southwestern position was burned and radiocarbon dating of its remains have placed it at 1555. The eastern structure was domestic in nature and was used for food preparation, cooking and possibly feasting. Except for a short time in the 14th century the Dyar mound and its accompanying structures were regularly rebuilt for over five centuries.

=== Site chronology ===
Archaeologists use changes in ceramic styles across multiple sites to determine timelines for entire regions. The ceramics found at the Dyar site show that it was abandoned for a time during the Scull Shoals (1250 - 1375), but was again inhabited from the Duvall Phase 1375 - 1450 until the time of European contact.

Phases	Dates	Periods	Pottery styles
Armour Phase	950 - 1100 CE	Early Etowah	Before site occupation
Stillhouse Phase	1100 - 1250 CE	Late Etowah	Etowah Complicated Stamped, Etowah Red Filmed, Savannah Check Stamped, Plain, Burnished Plain, and Coarse Plain
Scull Shoals Phase	1250 - 1375 CE	Savannah	Site abandoned during this period
Duvall Phase	1375 - 1450 CE	Early Lamar	Lamar var Plain, var Burnished Plain and var Coarse Plain but not var Incised, Morgan Incised, Etowah Complicated Stamped, and a stamped type which may be Savannah, Wilbanks, or Lamar Complicated Stamped.
Iron Horse Phase	1450 - 1520 CE	Middle Lamar	Lamar var Plain, var Incised, var Complicated Stamped, Coarse Plain, and Burnished Plain. The marker for the phase is Lamar Incised
Dyar Phase	1520 - 1580 CE	Late Lamar	Similar to preceding phase, which at one time were combined as one "Dyar phase". Incising of var Incised becomes finer over time
Bell Phase	1580 - 1640 CE	Historic	There is little evidence for occupation of the site during this period

== Excavations ==
While the mound had been described as early as the late 19th century, by C.C. Jones, and subject to undocumented amateur excavations, it was not systematically researched until 1975 when, in a project funded by the Georgia Power Company, it was excavated by a team led by Chester DePratter of the University of Georgia. Although hampered by damage done to the mound by amateurs, DePratter's research found it unique to the area, concluding that it was a large Lamar mound and village site. In other areas, soil evidence indicated plowing from the 19th century and poor farming practices in the area that century and the next. The area does not seem to have been the home of one group or people following one leader. Rather, evidence supports four phases of native occupation, ranging from 1100 to 1600: The Stillhouse phase, the Duvall phase, the Iron Horse phase, and the Dyar phase. Variance in ceramics are a strong indicator of the different phases. Pottery suggests that the area was occupied in the Stillhouse phase by people of the Etowah chiefdom. In the 15th century, after a period when the site was unoccupied, the region seems first to have been settled by Lamar people, as some Lamar artifacts were discovered in those remains. The final two phases are also Lamar occupancy, terminating in approximately 1555. Contact with Europeans may have led to the gradual abandonment of the mound.

== See also ==
- List of Mississippian sites
- Joe Bell site
- Kenimer site
- Summerour Mound site
