= Kenimer site =

Mounds in White County, Georgia

- Location within Georgia today
- 34°40′58.73″N 83°40′49.94″W
- Periods: Late Woodland period Napier Phase
- Location: Sautee Nacoochee, Georgia, White County, Georgia, USA
- Region: White County, Georgia

History
- Built: 900 CE

Site notes
- Architectural style: earthworks
- Excavation dates: 1997
- Archaeologists: Mark Williams Archaeology Field School, Department of Anthropology, University of Georgia

The Kenimer site (9Wh68) is an archaeological site near Sautee Nacoochee, Georgia in White County. The site contains two earthwork mounds located on top of a natural hilltop.

== Site description ==
The Kenimer site is located on an erosional remnant hill just to the north of and overlooking the Nacoochee Valley. It overlooks the junction of the Chattahoochee River and Sautee Creek, which is about 1.5 kilometres (0.93 mi) to the southeast. Mound A, the largest of the site's two mounds is 150 feet (46 m) above the level of the flood plain of the rivers and approximately 1,450 feet (440 m) above sea level. Georgia State Route 17 is positioned 300 metres (980 ft) to the north of Mound A.

Because the mounds are located on an irregularly shaped natural hill their exact dimensions are hard to determine and vary from side to side. The summit of Mound A is approximately 46 metres (151 ft) square. On its high northeastern side, it is more than 10 metres (33 ft) in height, and, on its western side adjacent to Mound B, it is 6 metres (20 ft) in height. Mound B is located to the west of Mound A and is oriented with both mounds' northwestern edges in a straight line. The summit is approximately 12 metres (39 ft) square. The elevation varies on each side but is generally not much over 1 metre (3.3 ft) in height.

The fact that the site is located on top of and utilizes an existing natural hill as part of its bulk is unusual. Another well known example of this in southeastern US archaeology is the Emerald Mound located near Natchez, Mississippi.

== Excavations ==
The site was mapped and test excavations were performed in the summer of 1997 under the direction of Mark Williams as part of the Archaeology Field School of the Department of Anthropology for the University of Georgia. Researchers found minimal debris from human habitation at the mounds, leading the archaeologists to conclude the site was used only for a short time and probably for ceremonial purposes since the surrounding topography would make it hard to have a village site adjacent to the mounds. Because of its unique features, it is possible the site was constructed to resemble the platform mounds of the Macon Plateau area, such as Ocmulgee site, located roughly 100 miles (160 km) to the south by peoples "that did not understand the construction history or social/religious context of such features."

Some pottery and lithic debris were found at the site. All the ceramic pottery sherds found at the site dated to the Late Woodland period Napier Phase, circa 900 CE. The lithic debris found at the site was all locally available quartz and Ridge and Valley chert from the northwestern Georgia area. A small greenstone celt was found during a posthole test on the summit of Mound A.

Napier phase ceramics were defined by archaeologists Jesse D. Jennings and Charles H. Fairbanks, who studied Ocmulgee Mounds National Historical Park. Named for the Napier site, near present-day Macon, Georgia, Napier Complicated Stamped ceramics are found in north-central Georgia between the Chattoochee, Oconee, and Flint rivers. This Late Woodland to early Mississippian period–pottery was tempered with grit.

== Controversy ==
In December 2011, architect Richard Thornton writing for the content farm Examiner.com claimed that the mound was of Mayan origin. Mark Williams, an archaeologist at the University of Georgia who has spent three days surface collecting at the site, wrote, "The Maya connection to legitimate Georgia archaeology is a wild and unsubstantiated guess on the part of the Thornton fellow. No archaeologists will defend this flight of fancy" and via his Facebook page: "This is total and complete bunk," and "There is no evidence of Maya in Georgia."

In 2010, archaeologist Johannes Loubser wrote in a peer-reviewed journal article that the excavations at the Track Rock archaeological site on the opposite side of the mountain from the Kenimer site had been halted when graves had been discovered, and the site was probably precontact. Thornton used excavations performed by Loubser as "evidence" for his theory. Upon learning this, Loubser responded, "I think that [Thornton] selectively presents the evidence. ... But he's a better marketer than I and other archaeologists are. When you make a claim like that, you have to back it up with hard evidence. There's a lot of opinion out there."

== See also ==
- List of Mississippian sites
- Dyar site
- Joe Bell site
- Mandeville site
- Nacoochee Mound
