= Joe Caldwell (archaeologist) =

American archaeologist

Joseph Ralston Caldwell (June 14, 1916 – December 23, 1973) was an American archaeologist. In the late 1930s he conducted major excavations in the Savannah, Georgia area at the Irene site as part of Depression-era archaeology program. He also led excavations at other archaeology sites in Georgia, such as the Summerour Mound site in the early 1950s. He was among those conducting extensive excavations prior to the development of Lake Hartwell and Lake Strom Thurmond, which flooded numerous archeological sites.

During his career Caldwell also served as a professor in the United States and for a year in Iran as a Fulbright scholar. Born in Cleveland, Ohio, he earned his undergraduate and graduate degrees in archeology at the University of Chicago.

== Career ==
=== United States ===
Joe Caldwell was a prominent figure in Georgia archaeology. In 1937, Caldwell began work at the Irene site in Chatham County, Georgia. This work was done as part of the Works Progress Administration (WPA). Caldwell's workforce was made up of nearly all African-American women. Their excavation of this site is still recognized as some of the best of the era. Caldwell remained at this site until 1941. During this time he worked with several other prominent Georgia archaeologists, including Antonio J. Waring, Jr., Preston Holder and Catherine McCann.

In the late 1930s he also visited Stallings Island with Waring, Jr. and collected a large number of artifacts during a surface survey. From 1939 to 1940, Caldwell also excavated at Wilmington Island, Georgia.

Caldwell served as a scientific aide to the Director of Anthropology of the United States National Museum from 1943 to 1945.

Caldwell returned to Georgia for more excavations in the 1950s. He did large block excavations at the Lake Spring site in 1951. He conducted survey and excavation at Lake Hartwell and Lake Strom Thurmond as part of the Smithsonian Institution’s River Basin Survey prior to construction of dams and reservoirs. This survey located and excavated hundreds of archaeological sites that were later inundated and destroyed when man-made lakes were created. In 1957, he received his Ph.D. from the University of Chicago.

=== Iran ===
From 1963 to 1964, Caldwell was a Fulbright professor of Archaeology at the University of Tehran and a professor of Anthropology at the Medical School of the National University of Iran. He worked on the Jiroft culture while in the Middle East.

=== Later years ===
In 1967 Caldwell accepted a position at the University of Georgia as a professor of Anthropology and the Director of the Laboratory of Archaeology. He taught there until his death in 1973.

Caldwell’s contribution to devising ceramic sequences included the St. Catherine’s series type. In addition to papers about the excavations he conducted, he published two works regarding ceramic sequencing; one appeared in 1971 and the second posthumously in 1977.

== Published works ==
Author

- Recent discoveries at Irene mound, Savannah. Proceedings of the Society for Georgia Archaeology, 1939, v. 2, no. 2, pp. 31-36.
- The results of archaeological work in Chatham County. Proceedings of the Society for Georgia Archaeology, 1940, v. 3, pp. 29-33.
- Cultural relations of four Indian sites on the Georgia coast. Unpublished M.A. thesis, 1943, Department of Anthropology, Univ. of Chicago.
- "The Archaeology of Eastern Georgia and South Carolina." In Griffin, J.B., ed., Archaeology of Eastern United States. Chicago: University of Chicago Press, 1952. pp. 312–321.
- The Old Quartz Industry of Piedmont Georgia and South Carolina. Southern Indian Studies, 1954. 5:37-38.
- "Trend and Tradition in the Prehistory of the Eastern United States," Scientific Papers, 1958, Vol. 10, Illinois State Museum, Springfield, and Memoir 88, American Anthropological Association, Menasha, Wisconsin.
- "Chronology of the Georgia Coast." Southeastern Archaeological Conference Bulletin, 1971, v. 13, pp. 88–92.
- Appraisal of the Archaeological Resources of Hartwell Reservoir, South Carolina and Georgia. South Carolina Institute of Archaeology and Anthropology, University of South Carolina, The Notebook, 1974. 6(2):35-44. Originally prepared in 1953.

Co-author

- Caldwell, Joseph R., and Waring, A.J., Jr., 1939, "The Use of a Ceramic Sequence in the Classification of Aboriginal sites in Chatham County, Georgia." Southeastern Archaeological Conference Newsletter, vol. 2, no. 1: 6–7.
- Caldwell, Joseph R., and Waring, A.J., Jr., 1939, "Some Chatham County pottery types and their sequence." Southeastern Archaeological Conference Newsletter, v. 1(5): 4–12; v.1(6). 1–9.
- Caldwell, Joseph and Catherine McCann, 1941, Irene Mound Site, Chatham County, Georgia, Athens: University of Georgia Press.
- Caldwell, Joseph R., and Antonio J. Waring, Jr., 1977, "Some Chatham County Pottery Types and Their Sequence." In The Waring Papers, The Collected Works of Antonio J. Waring, Jr., edited by Stephen Williams. Papers of the Peabody Museum of Archaeology and Ethnology, Harvard University, Cambridge, Massachusetts, Volume 58:110-134.
