= Nikwasi =

Pre-Columbian archaeological site in North Carolina

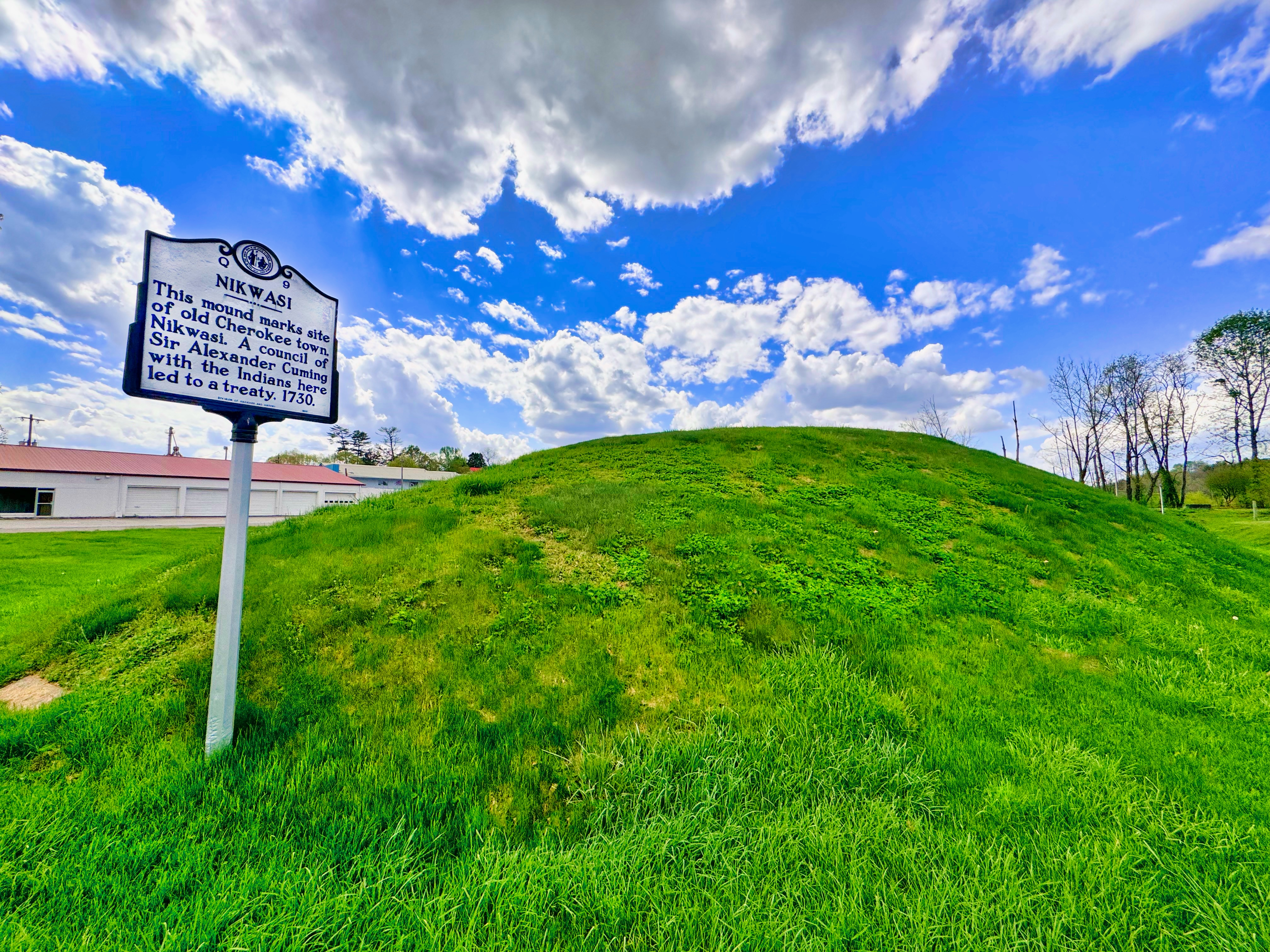
- Eastern side of Nikwasi mound

- Location within North Carolina Location within the United States
- 35.18499°N 83.37360°W
- Cultures: South Appalachian Mississippian; Cherokee
- Location: Modern day Franklin, North Carolina

History
- Abandoned: 1819
- Event: 1727 Treaty of Nikwasi

Site notes
- Architectural styles: platform mound, c.1000 CE
- Nequasee
- U.S. National Register of Historic Places
- Area: 18 acres (7.3 ha)
- NRHP reference No.: 80004598
- Added to NRHP: November 26, 1980

Nikwasi (Cherokee: ᏂᏆᏏ, romanized: Niquasi or Neequasee or Noquisiyi) which translates to "Star Place", is the site of the Cherokee town which is first found in colonial records in the early 18th century, but is much older. The town covered about 100 acres (40 ha) on the floodplain of the Little Tennessee River. Franklin, North Carolina, was later developed by European Americans around this site.

Today, a platform mound, estimated to have been built about 1000 CE, is the only extant feature left of the Cherokee town. The mound site and a small area has been owned and preserved by Franklin since 1946. It was listed on the National Register of Historic Places in 1980 as "Nequasee."

The federally recognized Eastern Band of Cherokee, which is based at Qualla Boundary, has been working to re-acquire its traditional lands and sacred mounds in this region. In 2019 the town of Franklin transferred the deed for Nikwasi mound to the Nikwasi Initiative, a non-profit set up by the EBCI, as part of this effort.

== History ==
The town (also known spelled as Ꮔꭷꮟ Nucassee) was founded sometime before the mid-1500s, as it appears on a 1566 map. It is first mentioned in 1718 in the records of the British colonies in America.

The town was a spiritual, cultural, and ceremonial center for the local Cherokee people, who considered it one of the "Mother Towns of their homeland." (Note: Kituwa, found on the Tuckaseegee River, is considered the first "Mother Town".) The Cherokee people kept the ever-burning sacred fire of Nikwasi located in the fire pit of their townhouse constructed on top of the mound. The fire had been kept burning since the beginning of their culture, and every townhouse had a fire pit for it.

A census conducted in 1721 by English missionaries estimated the population of Nikwasi as 162 people: 53 men, 50 women, and 59 children.

=== Treaty of 1727 ===
As was typical in the Cherokee heartland, the people built their townhouse or meeting hall on top of the central platform mound as their expression of public architecture, as it enabled the community to gather. The people of Nikwasi likely met here with a colonial delegation who came from Charleston, South Carolina in 1727; Colonel John Herbert took part in a treaty council held in the town house on December 3, 1727.

Following the Cherokee signing of the treaty with South Carolina, a self-appointed royal ambassador, Alexander Cuming, was hosted at the town from April 3 to 4, 1730. During the negotiations with the Cherokee, Cuming had met with Uku (or "First Beloved Man") Moytoy (known also as Ama-edohi). Cuming "appointed" Moytoy as "Emperor" of the Cherokee and secured a dubious pledge of allegiance of all the Cherokee peoples to King George II from him. The treaty was generally honored until 1741.

=== Further dealings with colonials ===
During the summer of 1761, the Nikwasi townhouse was used as a field hospital by members of a punitive English expedition against the Cherokee and other native American allies of France during the French and Indian War. James Grant led this force, which razed most of the town in their expedition. The Cherokee rebuilt their town.

By the time of the American Revolutionary War, the Cherokee had become allies of the British, hoping they would support the expulsion of settlers from Cherokee territory. During the Rutherford Light Horse expedition, rebel forces leveled the town on September 10, 1776. Rutherford burned the town and its farmlands to the ground. After an austere, harsh winter, the town sued for peace with the colonists the following Spring. The Cherokee rebuilt again and continued life at Nikwasi.

After the Revolutionary War, European-American migration west and settlement in Native American territories continued. In 1819 the federal government forced the Cherokee of this area to cede their lands and move into the Qualla Boundary. At that time Nikwasi mound and an associated 690 acres was first acquired by European Americans. This Indian Removal effort gathered force in the 1830s after Congress passed legislation in 1830 to authorize it.

== The mound ==
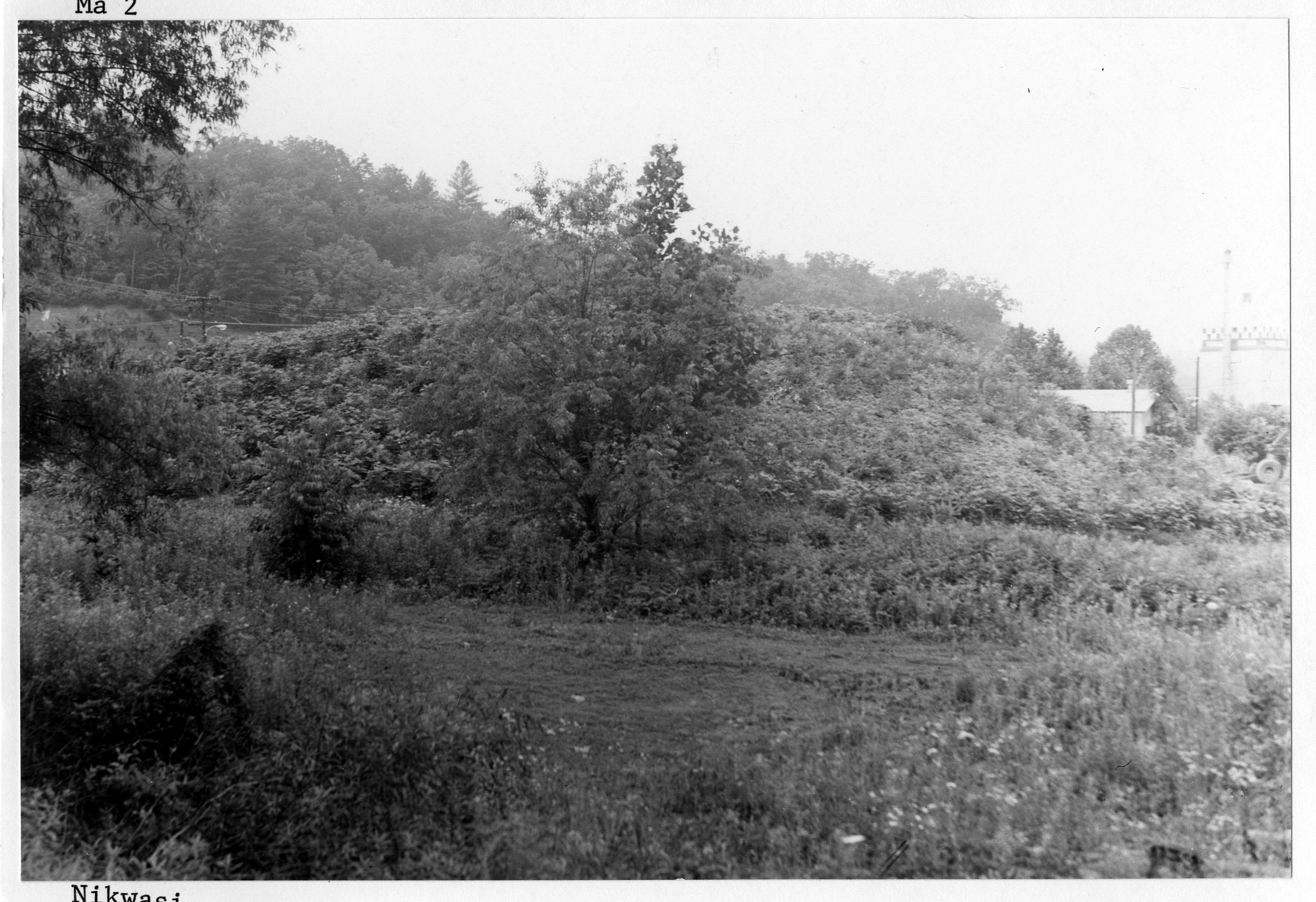
The Nikwasi Mound in June 1963 with the access ramp at the left

The platform mound (now better maintained than in the 1963 photo) is conspicuous to the many drivers who pass by daily on US 441 Business in downtown Franklin. The mound architecture has been well-preserved to the present, and the access ramp and flat summit continue to be easily differentiated.

A 2009 GPR survey revealed that the base of the mound is covered by one to two meters of combined alluvial deposits and manmade fill. As a result of these findings, it is clear that prior to the flooding and fill events, the mound enjoyed greater topographic prominence than currently, and was once a more impressive part of the cultural landscape than it is today. The mound appears to have been built by indigenous ancestors of the Cherokee in the South Appalachian Mississippian culture period, with construction estimated at the year 1000 CE.

The mound was privately owned for more than a century by various European Americans, and in 1946 the town of Franklin raised money to buy and preserve it. Schoolchildren were among those who donated for this purpose. The Eastern Band of Cherokee Indians (EBCI) has negotiated to acquire more control through the "Nikwasi Initiative," a non-profit organization. They plan for the mound to be featured as part of the "Nikwasi-Cowee Corridor," an EBCI proposal to highlight Nikwasi mound and the nearby Cowee Mound and village site (a similar ancient platform mound located across the Little Tennessee River and north of Franklin).

=== Archaeological and geophysical investigations ===
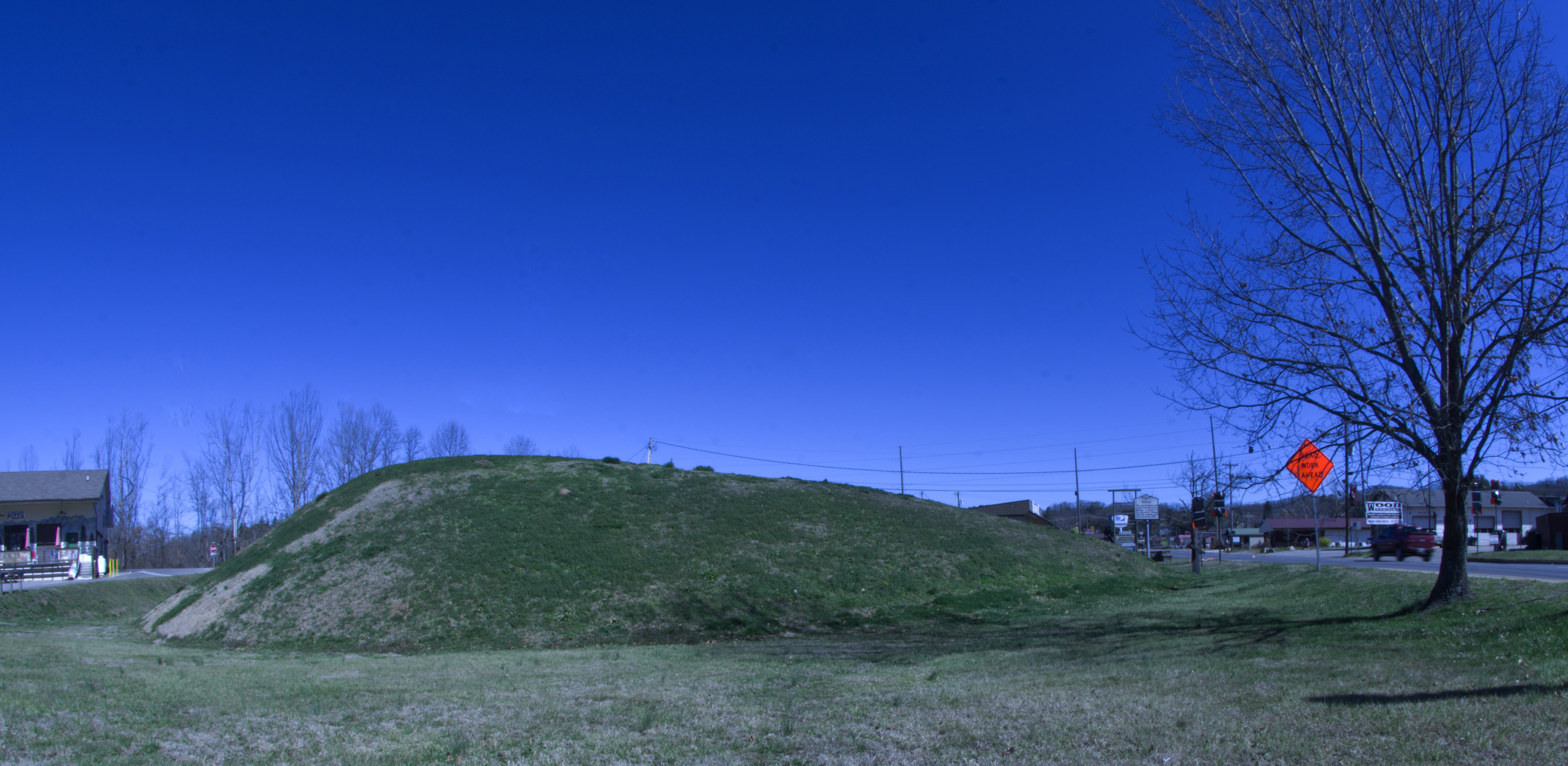
Western side of Nikwasi mound showing the access ramp to the right

The mound site takes its name from the historic Cherokee town which had covered about 100 acres there; it was documented in the English colonial records in the early 18th century. Based on the southeast orientation of the ramp and the results of a 2009 ground-penetrating radar survey, the summit of the mound is thought to have been the seat of the Cherokee communal townhouse for the town. Here the Cherokee leaders hosted British and American delegations through the years.

A single 5′ x 5′ test shaft dug by University of North Carolina archaeologists in 1963 constitutes the entirety of formal excavation known to have been undertaken at Nikwasi. The mound's excellent state of preservation owes much to the fact that it was never opened by the Smithsonian during the 1880s, when its staff excavated some ancient mounds. In 1980, the mound was listed on the National Register of Historic Places (NRHP), in the transliterated spelling of "Nequasee."

=== Preservation efforts ===
In 2012, Franklin sprayed herbicide on the mound to control the grass. The Eastern Band of the Cherokee regarded this as "desecration", and principal chief Michell Hicks asked for the site to be turned over to the Eastern Band, which the town refused to do.

As noted above, the Eastern Band formed the Nikwasi Initiative, a non-profit designed to work on development and interpretation in the area related to historic Cherokee and ancient indigenous sites along the Little Tennessee River.

In 2017 the Eastern Band bought a building next to the mound, later studying whether to adapt it for use as a museum. In May 2019, the town of Franklin transferred the mound to the non-profit Nikwasi Initiative. The Tribal Council of the Eastern Band of the Cherokee voted in July 2019 to provide $300,000 to the Nikwasi Initiative.

The Mainspring Conservation Trust acquired Watauga Mound and part of its historic town site in 2020, for conservation. It is located north of Franklin along the Little Tennessee River. Mainspring is working with the EBCI and Nikwasi Initiative to preserve this property and have it be part of the Nikwasi-Cowee Corridor.

On February 26, 2026, the Eastern Band of Cherokee Indians officially regained ownership of the Nikwasi Mound after over 200 years, following a vote by the Franklin, North Carolina town council to return the land.

== See also ==
- List of Mississippian sites
- National Register of Historic Places listings in Macon County, North Carolina
