= Samuel Stalnaker =

Virginia frontiersman

- Born: Samuel Stalnaker; 1715; Westphalia, Holy Roman Empire
- Died: 1769 (aged 53–54); Chilhowie, Virginia
- Occupations: Guide, Indian trader, tavern owner/proprietor
- Known for: Escape from captivity among the Shawnees, and journey 460 miles to Williamsburg, to warn of imminent attacks by the French on English settlements; Among the first Europeans to cross the Cumberland Gap
- Spouses: Susanna (d. 18 June 1755); Margaret
- Children: Jacob, Adam, Maria Barbara, Samuel, and George Christian

Samuel Stalnaker (1682 or 1715 – 1769) was an explorer, trapper, guide and one of the first settlers on the Virginia frontier. He established a trading post, hotel and tavern in 1752 near what is now Chilhowie, Virginia. He was held captive by Shawnee Indians at Lower Shawneetown in Kentucky for almost a year, before escaping and traveling over 460 miles to Williamsburg, Virginia, to report on French preparations to attack English settlements in Virginia and Pennsylvania. He later served as a guide under George Washington during the French and Indian War.

== Birth and arrival in Virginia ==
Samuel Stalnaker was probably born about 1715, although some sources give a birthdate of 1682. He was born either in the Palatinate of southwestern Germany, or in Westphalia, or possibly in western New York or Pennsylvania. George and Adam, who accompanied or followed him to southwestern Virginia, were probably his brothers. Some sources report his arrival in Virginia as early as 1732. In December 1742, he first appears in the records (as "Samuel Stolenacre"), in the estate settlement of Matthias Harmon in Hanover Township, Montgomery County, Pennsylvania. By 1745, Samuel Stalnaker was living on the New River in southwestern Virginia, which was the far frontier and populated mainly by Scots-Irish and German immigrants, as well as English settlers from farther east in Virginia. He and his wife Susanna had a daughter, Maria Barbara, in 1743, who was not christened until November 1755. In October 1745, Samuel bought land granted to the Wood's River Company. He paid John Buchanan, agent for the company, £3 for 100 acres opposite the Buffalo Pound (later Bingamon's and then Pepper's Ferry) near what is now Radford, Virginia.

== First homestead on the Holston River ==
Stalnaker's settlement on the Middle Fork of the Holston River is marked on Thomas Hutchins' map of Virginia, Pennsylvania, Maryland, and North Carolina, as "S. Stahlmakers, the two farthest settlements in Virginia in the year 1755," center of lower right quadrant.

Dr. Thomas Walker writes in his journal that in April 1748, he met Stalnaker, then on his way to visit the Cherokees between the Reedy Creek settlement and the Holston River. Stalnaker had established a trading post and traded with the Indians of southern Ohio, Kentucky, and the Carolinas, and was already an experienced trader and hunter. In November 1749 he and his wife Susanna had a son, Samuel, and then moved even further west to the Holston River, (near present-day Chilhowie, Virginia), referred to in James Patton's will as a "tract of land of about 5,000 acres on which Samuel Stalnaker lived." On 23 March 1750, Dr. Walker and his associates again met Stalnaker on the middle fork of the Holston River, on the north side, just a few miles above its junction with the South Fork, and helped him to build a cabin there. Walker himself states in his journal:

"March 23rd, we kept down the Holston River about four miles and camped; then Mr. Ambrose Powell and I went to look for Samuel Stalnaker, who I had been informed was just moved out to settle. We found his camp, and returned to our own in the evening. Mar. 24th, we went to Stalnaker's, helped him to raise his house and camped about a quarter of a mile below him."

Stalnaker was Virginia's westernmost colonial settler. His route to the Cherokees, with whom he was trading for skins and furs at the time, was a passage through the mountains later to be named the Cumberland Gap by Walker, in honor of Prince William, Duke of Cumberland, son of King George II of Great Britain.Stalnaker acted as a guide and Indian liaison to Walker and his crew leading them through the treacherous path to the lands west so that they could chart the then unknown territory. In May 1750, Stalnaker was listed as "Saml. Stanlick" as part of a team to build roads from Ezekiel Calhoun's to Wood's River and then to the South Fork of the Roanoke. This road opened up traffic and commerce, inviting an influx of settlers from other parts of colonial Virginia, and Stalnaker decided to open a tavern and hotel alongside his trading post to take advantage of the growing activity.

On 21 November 1752, Samuel qualified as a captain of foot in the Virginia militia, then under the command of the newly commissioned Major George Washington.

== Stalnaker's tavern ==
On 7 November 1752, he posted a large bond, in the amount of ten thousand pounds of tobacco, with Alexander Sayers, for an ordinary (tavern-keeper's) license:

"Know all men by these presents that we, Saml. Stalnaker and Alexander Sayers are held and firmly bound to our sovereign Lord, George the Second, in the sum of ten thousand pounds of tobacco to which the payment well and truly to be made we bind ourselves and every of us and every of our heirs, executors, administrators, jointly and severally, firmly by these presents sealed with our seals and dated this 7th day of Nov. 1752. THE CONDITION of this obligation is such that whereas the above bound Saml. Stalnaker hath obtained a license to keep an ordinary in this county; if therefore, the said Stalnaker doth constantly find and provide in his ordinary good, wholesome and cleanly lodgings and diet for travelers and stablage and fodder and provender, or pasturage and provender as the season shall require for horses, for and during the term of one year from this seven day of Nov. and shall not suffer or permit any unlawful gaming in this house on the Sabbath day or suffer or permit any to tipple or drink more than is necessary; then this obligation to be void and of none effect or else to remain in full force and virtue."

Samuel Stalnaker signed this bond with his initials "S. S."

Records indicate that Stalnaker used the structure he had originally built as a fort in 1748 and renovated it as a tavern.

By 1752 there was apparently a large encampment of Cherokees near Samuel's trading post on the Holston. The Cherokees came to trade at Stalnaker's and settled there more or less permanently, and Stalnaker provided them with corn and other supplies. When Stalnaker asked the Governor Robert Dinwiddie to pay for their keep, the Governor refused until they finished a road they had agreed to build, and Samuel started charging them for their provisions. In January 1753, a Cherokee leader known as "The Emperor" (possibly either Amouskositte or Moytoy of Citico) petitioned Governor Dinwiddie for the removal of Stalnaker from his farm on the Holston River because Stalnaker was allegedly overcharging the Cherokees for goods at his trading post. This charge was supported by Erwin Patterson, Stalnaker's neighbor. The Governor agreed to order Stalnaker to charge fair prices. An investigation proved that Stalnaker's prices were reasonable and that the Cherokees were satisfied. On 24 November 1753, the governor ordered a road built from Stalnaker's settlement to that of James Davis, trusting Samuel Stalnaker to oversee the work. His three sons George, Adam and Jacob were among the crew. At the same time, existing roads were extended as far as Roanoke, Virginia, allowing for additional traffic, improved communications and new commercial opportunities.

Stalnaker's tavern became known as "The Town House." In negotiating the Catawaba and Cherokee Treaty of March 1756, the Indians requested that the treaty be held at Stalnaker's tavern, as it was near the home of Conocotocko, the Cherokee chieftain who wanted to participate, Samuel Stalnaker himself had been captured by the Indians and was believed dead. The tavern eventually became a stagecoach stop under the name Chillhowie Springs by 1815.

In 1938 Leo Stalnaker reported that the remains of Samuel Stalnaker's tavern were still standing just outside Chilhowie, Virginia, and described it as "very likely the original log cabin of Samuel Stalnaker which later had been weather-boarded and enlarged into an Inn...[It is] a two-story, rambling building obviously used as a tavern. Numbers are still on the doors upstairs [and]...logs of a cabin are visible behind rotting weatherboarding."

== Capture and escape ==
On 18 June 1755, Shawnee Indians attacked Samuel Stalnaker's settlement, capturing Stalnaker, his wife and son Adam, along with Samuel Hydon, Matthias Counce, and an unnamed male servant. They executed all except Stalnaker and Hydon. Stalnaker's mother and four children were in another building when the Indians rushed the house, and got away by hiding in a "rye patch." Stalnaker and Hydon were taken through Glinch Valley along the Sandy Creek by the Indians on their way to Ohio.

The Pennsylvania Gazette reported:

Williamsburg, July 11. Last Sunday an Express arrived in Town, with the melancholly News of several more of our inhabitants being cut off, on Holston's River. Captain Stallnicher and his Wife were taken Prisoners, his Mother and four Children being in an Out House made their escape, and concealed themselves in a Rye Patch, till the Affair was over; there were three more taken prisoner and killed. Colonel Stewart, and William Long, on their Return from Fort Cumberland, where they had been to supply Provisions for the Army, were shot at there several Times, but escaped unhurt to the Augusta Court-House, from whence they were about 45 Miles distant.

On 20 August 1755, John Buchanan, Samuel Stalnaker's colonel in the militia, assuming he was dead, filed at the Augusta County Courthouse to administer his estate. Stalnaker's fellow officers Captain Israel Christian and Captain Pat Martin, were sureties on Buchanan's bond as administrator.

The Indians took the prisoners to "Fort Ouabach" (possibly Fort Ouiatenon in Indiana), and then to "the Shawnese Towns" (Lower Shawneetown) on the Ohio River. An article in the New-York Mercury of 16 February 1756, describing Mary Draper Ingles' escape from captivity mentions that, during her stay in Lower Shawneetown in August 1755, she met Stalnaker and reported "that Capt. Stahlnicker, who was carried Captive from Holston River, and supposed to be kill'd, was still a Prisoner among them, and was in Health."

Major Andrew Lewis led the Sandy Creek Expedition from mid-February until April 1756, in a failed attempt to rescue prisoners taken by the Shawnee. On Sunday, 29 February 1756, Captain William Preston wrote in his journal: "The creek has been much frequently used by Indians both traveling and hunting on it, and...I am apprehensive that Stalnaker and the prisoners taken with him were carried this way." The expedition was planning to attack Lower Shawneetown (where Stalnaker was being held), but bad weather and inadequate supplies forced them to turn back and abandon their mission.

On 10 May 1756, Stalnaker escaped and traveled for 40 days, covering over 460 miles to Williamsburg, Virginia to report to Governor Robert Dinwiddie on an impending assault by the French and Indians on English frontier settlements. A letter from the governor dated 21 June 1756 reports Stalnaker's escape: "One Stalniker, who was taken prisoner by the Shawnesse, made his escape and says he saw six Fr. Officers with 1,000 Ind's from Oubatch, bound to F't Dusquesne, and reports they intended to visit our Front's y's Sumer." The Pennsylvania Gazette reported:

"Williamsburg, June 11 -- Capt. Stalnacker, who was taken Prisoner by the Shawnese, the 18th of June last, on Holston's River, and has been at the Shawnese Town, and Ouabach [Wabash] Fort ever since, till the tenth of last Month, when he made his Escape from them, is come to this Town, and informs us, that on the evening before he made his escape (9 May 1756), 1,000 Indians and six French officers came to the Shawnese Town, destined for Fort Duquesne, to wait there some time to see whether any attempt would be made upon it, and if not, to disperse themselves, and fall upon the Frontiers of Virginia and Pennsylvania."

On 29 July 1756, at a council of War in Staunton, Virginia with Colonel Buchanan, Stalnaker represented the Holston Settlement and recommended that stockade forts be built at Dunkard's Bottom on the New River and Davis' Bottom at the middle fork of the Holston River.

== Military service in the French and Indian War ==
On 8 September 1756, Governor Dinwiddie, writing to Colonel Clement Reed, acknowledged the receipt of a letter from that officer through Captain Stalnaker and said "Give Stalnaker 100 pounds to qualify him to raise his Company and build a stockade fort at Drapers Meadow." Dinwiddie also proposed promoting Stalnaker to lieutenant. Governor Dinwiddie wrote to Major Lewis on 17 December 1756: "As to Stalnaker...I'm of the Opin'n he sh'd, and desire [you would] apoint him a Lieut., in one of the Forts, as probably he may be of Service hereafter, being well acquainted in the Woods and a good Pilot or Guide on Occasion."

A second Sandy Creek expedition was planned in early 1757, and Stalnaker was going to participate, but the plan was never implemented.

By the summer of 1758, Stalnaker was serving as a guide or scout with the British troops commanded by Colonel Henry Bouquet in western Maryland. Colonel Washington wrote to Henry Bouquet on 25 July 1758: "Kelly and Stalnaker (two Guides) are on the Road with Major Peachy."

== Final years ==
Stalnaker must have remarried, because in the fall of 1761 he and his wife Margaret served as administrators of the estate of Valentine Snyder, who had died in 1755, and Vincent Williams, killed by Bemino in a raid in 1756. Stalnaker continued to operate his tavern, which served Colonel William Byrd and his troops in 1761 during the Anglo-Cherokee War, when they constructed a blockhouse named Fort Attakullakulla nearby. While staying at Stalnaker's tavern in July 1761, Major Robert Stewart wrote a letter to George Washington, mentioning that construction of the fort at Stalnaker's settlement was delayed due to an "epedemick" fever (possibly malaria) which had affected most of his troops.

At some time in the 1760s Stalnaker may have gone to South Carolina with his daughter Barbara. Records show that he purchased land there, but had returned to Hampshire County, Virginia by 1768. He was last seen in May 1769, when he was visited at his home by J. F. D. Smyth (John Ferdinand Dalziel Smyth, pen name of John Ferdinand Smyth Stuart), an English traveler, who found him living at his old log cabin on the middle fork of the Holston River. Smyth says that after crossing the stream three times during the day,

"at night we came to Stalnaker's where a few people, indeed all the inhabitants, had erected a kind of wretched stockade fort for protection against Indians; but they had all left it a few days before our arrival and returned to their respective homes. We remained two days at the old Dutchman's house, for rest and refreshment for ourselves and horses, and also our future route, which was into Kentucky. The old pioneer, Capt. Stalnaker, still wise in all the learning of the wilderness was able to describe to Smyth, as he had to Walker many years before, a new route into Kentucky, which had recently been discovered, and which was a nearer way than commonly used."

Samuel Stalnaker does not appear in records after this, and 1769 is generally recorded as the date of his death and burial.

== Family and children ==
Samuel Stalnaker is believed to have had three brothers, George, Jacob and Adam. He had five children: Jacob (1737–1834), Adam (1738–1755), Maria Barbara (born 1743), Samuel (born 1749, christened 15 November 1750), and George Christian (born 18 November 1752). His first wife Susanna and his son Adam were killed during the Shawnee attack on 18 June 1755. He remarried to Margaret sometime around 1761.

== See also ==
- Mary Draper Ingles
- Draper's Meadow Massacre
- Lower Shawneetown
- Sandy Creek Expedition
