= James Patton (Virginia colonist) =

Irish soldier & Virginia settler (1690–1755)

Member of the House of Burgesses from Augusta County
- In office 1753 – 30 July 1755
- Preceded by: John Madison

Personal details
- Born: 1690 or 1692 County Donegal, Ireland
- Died: 30 July 1755 (aged 62–63) Draper's Meadow, Montgomery County, Colony of Virginia
- Cause of death: Killed in action by Shawnee warriors
- Spouse(s): Ally Patton (died 1728); Mary Osborne (died c. 1749)
- Children: Mary (b. 1730); Margaret (b. 1731 or 1732); John (b. 1734)
- Parent(s): Henry Patton; Sarah Lynn Patton
- Relatives: John Lewis (uncle); John Buchanan (son-in-law); William Preston (nephew); James Patton Preston (grand nephew); Francis Gracey Childers (great-great grandson)

Military service
- Allegiance: Colony of Virginia
- Branch/service: Virginia militia
- Years of service: 1742–1755
- Rank: Colonel
- Commands: Augusta County Militia
- Battles/wars: French and Indian War; Battle of Galudoghson; Draper's Meadow massacre †

James Lynn Patton (1690 or 1692 – 30 July 1755) was an Irish-born merchant, pioneer frontiersman, and soldier who settled parts of Virginia's Shenandoah Valley. Between his immigration to Virginia in 1740, and his death there in 1755, he was a prominent figure in the exploration, settlement, governance, and military leadership of the colony. Patton held such Augusta County offices as Justice of the Peace, Colonel of Militia and Chief Commander of the Augusta County Militia, County Lieutenant, President of the Augusta Court, commissioner of the Tinkling Spring congregation, county coroner, county escheator, collector of duties on furs and skins, and county sheriff. He also was President of the Augusta Parish Vestry and a member of the Virginia House of Burgesses. He was present at three important treaty conferences with Iroquois and Cherokee leaders. Patton was killed in action by Shawnee warriors at the Draper's Meadow massacre in July 1755.

== Birth and early life ==
Little is known about Patton's early life. Much published biographical information is based on hearsay or speculation. He was born in 1690 or 1692 in Ireland, probably County Donegal, (Note: Glanville and Mays offer "circumstantial evidence" that Patton was born in or near Lough Swilly in County Donegal.) and may have spent some of his early years in Derry. Henry Patton is frequently named as his father and Sarah Lynn as his mother, but there is no reliable or primary source documentation to support this. Letitia Preston Floyd says that Patton had four sisters. Patricia Givens Johnson reports family traditions that Patton's grandfather was born in Scotland, that James had an older brother and was therefore not eligible for any inheritance, which motivated him to become a sailor. She notes that Patton is said to have served in the British Royal Navy in Queen Anne's War, which ended in 1713, and that soon afterwards he "procured" a passenger ship and began trading in Virginia.

Letitia Preston Floyd claimed that Patton served as an officer in the Royal Navy, however no evidence to support this has been found, based on investigations into lists of officers available in Great Britain. There is some evidence that his first wife, named Ally, died in June 1728 and is buried in Whitehaven. Between 1734 and 1740, Patton apparently lived in the royal Burgh of Kirkcudbright in Dumfries and Galloway in southern Scotland, where he was named a burgess in December 1734.

== Career as a merchant sea captain ==
Documents indicate that Patton was a merchant ship captain at least by 1723, possibly as early as 1719. He was apparently involved in transatlantic smuggling of tobacco and other goods for the merchant Walter Lutwidge, owner of a small shipping fleet operating out of the Solway Firth. Records indicate that he served as captain of the Pearl (a galley), the Cockermouth, the Davy, the Andrew & Betty, the William, the Basil, and the Walpole. In November 1729, Patton's ship the William ran aground near Padstow in northern Cornwall. An article in The Weekly Journal: or, The British-Gazetteer, on 6 December 1729, states:

“Letters from Padstow in Cornwal, of the 17th of Nov, advise that the William of Dumfries, Capt. James Patton, was drove on a sandy Bank there, on the 14th...The Inhabitants seeing this Prize, sallied out in great Numbers, and began to cut and hew the Ship and Tackle, till the Captain, being well provided with Fire Arms, by an uncommon Bravery threatned to discharge them among the Rabble; whereupon many of them dispersed."

Lutwidge and Patton had numerous disagreements, as detailed in Lutwidge's preserved letters from 1739 to 1740. In December 1739 Lutwidge wrote: "I have mett wth Boath Knaves and fooles in plenty...but of all ye Knaves I Ever mett with, Patton has out don them all.... Hell itself can’t outdo him."

Patton brought goods by ship to several European ports, including Amsterdam and Genoa. He frequently landed at Hobb's Hole in Virginia. Patricia Johnson states that Patton also transported slaves to Virginia. In 1730, he brought to Virginia the thoroughbred stallion racehorse Bulle Rock, retired from racing, but who was mated to at least 39 English or Spanish mares and sired many other well-known racehorses. Patton was the first person to import a thoroughbred horse to the New World.

== Immigration to Virginia, 1740 ==
The first reliable evidence of Patton's activities in Virginia is two letters from William Beverley, addressed to Patton at Kirkcudbright. Beverley was a wealthy Virginia politician who was active in importing and exporting a variety of goods. In 1736, Beverley obtained a 118,000-acre land grant, later called Beverley Manor, which encompasses much of present-day Augusta County. A grantee was able to keep 1000 acres for every family that settled on the land. In 1737 Beverley represented Virginia's Orange County (from which Augusta County was created in 1738) in the Virginia House of Burgesses. On August 8, 1737, Beverley wrote to Patton, "I should be very glad if you could import families enough to take the whole off from our hands at a reasonable price and tho' the order mentions families from Pensilvania [sic], yet families from Ireland will do as well." On 22 August, Beverley wrote a second letter, stating that the grant was for 30,000 acres. He offered Patton one quarter of it in payment for Patton's efforts "to procure families to come in & settle it." Beverley also wrote, "I heartily wish you success & a safe return to us," suggesting that Patton had already visited Virginia and had met Beverley in person. The letters indicate that Patton and Beverley had been corresponding for some time.

In 1738, Patton sailed to Virginia from the port of Whitehaven, as captain of the Walpole, arriving at Belle Haven, Fairfax County, Virginia on 26 August. Among his passengers was his sister Elizabeth, her husband John Preston, and her son, the 8-year-old William Preston, Patton's nephew, and forty-six other prospective settlers. There is some evidence that Patton's wife and two daughters were also on board. Letitia Floyd Lewis, granddaughter of William Preston, wrote a letter to Robert William Hughes, dated 13 June 1879, describing her family history. Although the original letter appears to be lost, a transcription was printed in The Richmond Standard on 18 September 1880. The letter says that:

"...Col. James Patton, who with his friends and relatives James and John Buchanan, and John Lewis (Note: Lewis had in fact arrived in Virginia in about 1730.) and John Preston, emigrated from the north of Ireland, near Londonderry, to Augusta Co, Va., in the year 1736...The then route of emigration and discovery was up the Valley of Virginia from Pennsylvania, though the first landing, as my mother told me, of these emigrants was near Alexandria, Virginia, at some place known as Belle Haven (at the mouth of Cameron Run)."

John Preston, a carpenter, was employed as a shipwright during the voyage, and Beverley promised him 4000 acres of land. Patton appears to have made two final trips to Europe in 1739 and 1740, carrying cargoes of linen, iron, wool, and timber to Holland and bringing goods from there back to Britain. In April, 1740, he returned to Virginia on his final transatlantic voyage.

From Fairfax, Patton purchased or rented pack-horses and he and his family traveled overland to the settlement of Patton's uncle John Lewis at Lewis Creek, near what is now Staunton. During the next few months, they began clearing the land around what they later named Spring Hill, on Christians Creek on the South Fork of the Shenandoah River, near present-day Stuarts Draft, Virginia.

== Religious activities ==
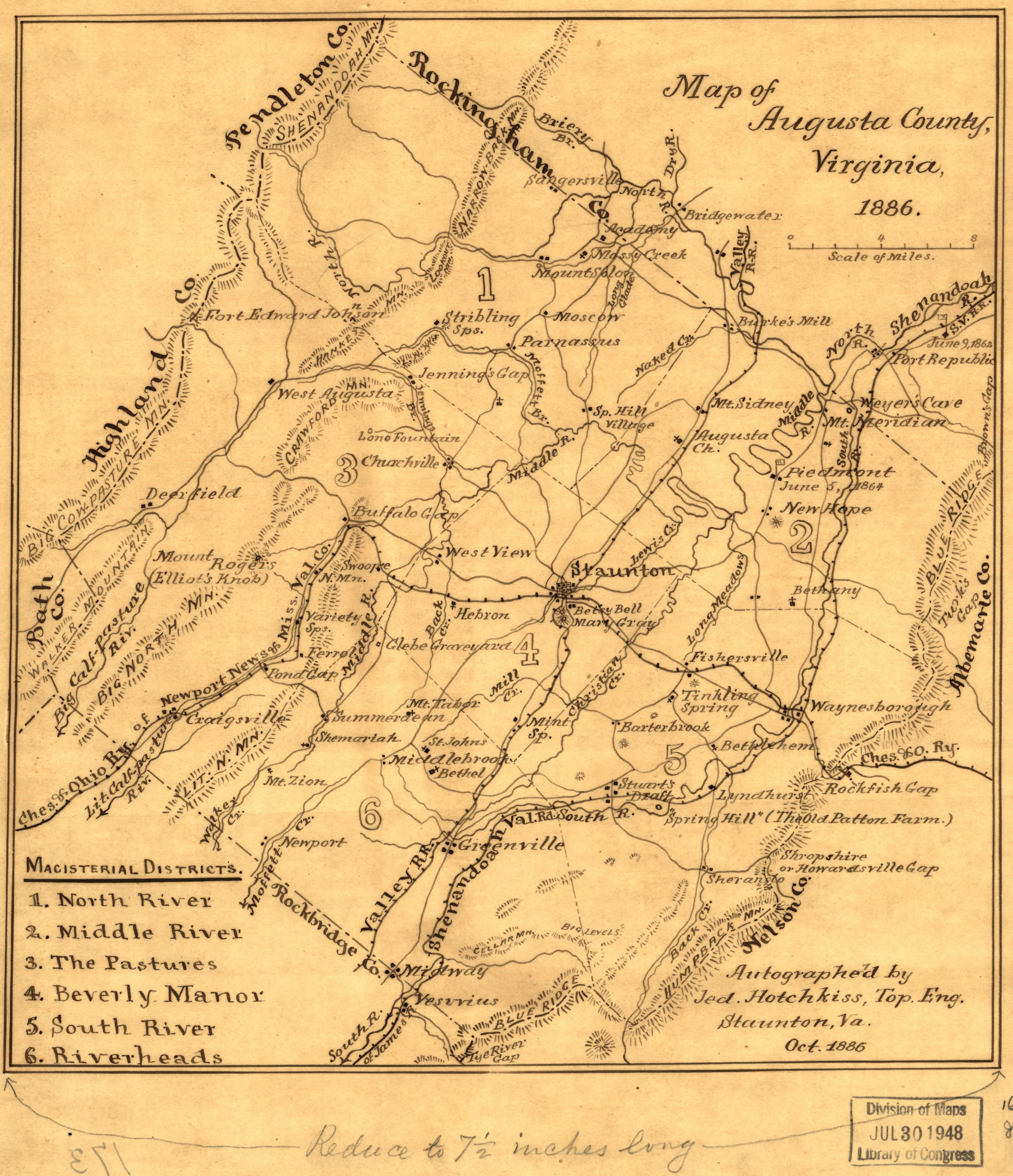
1886 map of Augusta County showing the location of Patton's Spring Hill homestead and the Tinkling Spring Meeting House, both in the lower right quadrant.

Soon after the Prestons and Pattons arrived, James Patton invited the Presbyterian minister James Anderson to deliver a sermon in his home. In 1740, a permanent preacher, John Craig, settled in the area. Patton and three other men were elected commissioners of the Tinkling Spring congregation in 1741, according to the monument at Tinkling Spring Presbyterian Church. In 1742, Patton underwrote the cost of construction of the Tinkling Spring Meeting House in Tinkling Springs (present-day Fishersville), one of the first recognized churches in the Shenandoah Valley. Initially a one-room log structure, it took nearly three years to finish, with some controversy between Patton and his uncle John Lewis over where it was to be located. The first service was held there on 14 April 1745, when the Reverend Craig wrote: "This being the first day we meet at the contentious meeting-house, about half-built." The log structure was replaced by a stone building in 1790. Patton's rivalry with his uncle continued for years afterwards. The Reverend John Craig wrote: "...a Difference happened between Col. John Lewis & Col. James Patton, both Living in that Congregation, which Continued while they Lived, Which of them Should be highest in Commission & power."

In 1746, Patton was elected President of the Augusta Parish Vestry.

In 1748, Patton provided wood, stone and five acres of land to build a parsonage. He also donated land for the third Lutheran church built in Virginia, located on the Holston River, and for another Lutheran church at Prices Fork, which was named St. Michael's and built in 1770.

== Legal roles ==
On 3 November 1741, Patton was appointed Justice of the Peace by order of Governor Gooch. In October 1743, Governor Gooch commissioned Patton as "collector of duties upon skins and furs in Augusta County," as well as collector of duties on all horses arriving in Augusta County. On 10 October 1745, Patton was appointed magistrate and also the first sheriff of Augusta County, but served only one year as sheriff. He was replaced as sheriff in June 1746 by his uncle John Lewis. As president of the county court, from July 1746 to May 1749, Patton presided over forty-five out of fifty-two regularly scheduled court days, as well as ten out of eleven individual criminal trials. On 15 July 1752, Patton was commissioned Augusta County Coroner by Governor Dinwiddie, and served in this role until replaced by John Madison in 1753.

In January 1753, Patton was asked to hear a case in which a Cherokee leader known as "The Emperor" (possibly either Amouskositte or Moytoy of Citico) had traveled to Williamsburg where he petitioned Governor Dinwiddie for the removal of Samuel Stalnaker from his farm on the Holston River because Stalnaker, a tenant farmer living on land owned by Patton, was allegedly overcharging the Cherokees for goods at his trading post. The Governor agreed to order Stalnaker to charge fair prices, however on his return to the Holston River area, the Emperor was attacked and beaten by a settler named John Connally. Patton agreed to mediate between the Cherokee and the settlers, as there was concern that the incident might lead to Cherokee attacks on white settlements, and issued an arrest warrant for Connally, who fled to North Carolina. An investigation later proved that Stalnaker's prices were reasonable and that the Cherokees were satisfied.

On 19 April 1754, Patton was commissioned Escheator of Augusta County by Governor Dinwiddie. In May, Patton heard a case involving a landowner named John Grymes, who was dissatisfied with Patton's judgment and called him a fool. Patton fined Grymes five pounds for contempt of court, and while Patton "was delivering the Courts opinion and directing the Clerk to Enter the s[ai]d Order, the s[ai]d Grymes still continued gros[s]ly to abuse the said Patton by Calling him a whoresbird &c." Patton fined Grymes an additional £25 and forced him to put up a bond of £100 to ensure "good behavior." Six months later, Grymes again appeared in court with a pardon signed by the governor, given on condition that he apologize and recognize the court's authority. Court documents show that he "ask'd the Courts and more Espitially the s[ai]d Pattons pardon for his past misbehaviour," and so was released from paying the fine or posting the bond.

== Military service ==
A letter of 24 April 1742, from Governor William Gooch announces Patton's commission as a "Colonel of Augusta County," and the commission was confirmed on 27 May 1742.

In December 1742, the Augusta County militia engaged in combat with a group of twenty-two Onondaga and seven Oneida Indians who had traveled to Virginia from Shamokin in Pennsylvania, under the command of an Iroquois chief named Jonnhaty, to participate in a campaign against the Catawba. An account of the battle, known as the Battle of Galudoghson, was given to Conrad Weiser by Shikellamy's grandson in February, 1743. The grandson claimed that suspicious white settlers, thinking that this war party planned to raid Virginia settlements, attacked them. The settlers later reported that the Indians had killed several hogs and horses belonging to the settlers, and "went to Peoples houses, Scared the women and Children [and] took what they wanted." The militia were called in, and Patton ordered them to escort the war party out of Augusta County. The militia followed the warriors for two days, until one of the Indians made a detour into the forest near Balcony Falls, possibly to relieve himself, and a militiaman fired at him. The Indians then attacked and killed the militia captain, John McDowell. In the battle that followed, three or four of the Indian warriors and eight or ten militiamen were killed. The Indians then fled into the forest and later returned to Shamokin. Patton reports that he rode to the scene with twenty-three reinforcements, arriving two or three hours after the fighting had ended. Patton received reports from the militia that they had seen "white men (whom we believe to be French) among the Indians," and responded by ordering patrols "on all our frontiers, well equipp'd." Patton wrote to Governor Dinwiddie that "we have certain news of one Hundred and fifty Indians seen seventy miles above me, and about the same number lately crost Patowmack on their way up here." Dinwiddie sent powder and shot to Patton and alerted the militia in Orange and Fairfax counties, but no more intruders appeared.

On 16 July 1752, Governor Dinwiddie commissioned Patton as Lieutenant of Augusta County and Chief Commander of the Augusta County Militia.

In January 1754, Governor Dinwiddie ordered Patton to select fifty volunteers to be sent to Alexandria, where they would join forces under the command of Major George Washington, "to support those who are already there building a fort." These men were present at the Battle of Fort Necessity in July, 1754. On 11 September, Dinwiddie ordered (now Colonel) Washington to send Andrew Lewis "with forty or fifty Men" to Augusta County, where he would coordinate with Patton to "protect our Frontier from Small Incursions of Indians and...some French."

On 8 July 1755, Dinwiddie wrote to Patton, ordering him to raise a company of rangers for the defense of Augusta County: "You will immediately list fifty Men as Rangers for guard of the frontiers of [that] county..." On 16 July Dinwiddie wrote to Colonel Stewart, noting that "Colo. Patton carried up some Powder and Shot with him, and I shall now send 4 [barrels] Powder and Lead for the Court House for the Service of the People." On 1 August Dinwiddie wrote to Patton (unaware of his death) that he was sending a "cart load of ammunition &c. for the [Court House]," adding "I have good reason to believe the Indians are not so numerous as you imagine, however all possible care should be used to oppose their barbarities." On 11 August Dinwiddie wrote to Colonel Stewart: "I...am heartily sorry for the death of Colo. Patton, and I think he was wrong to go so far back [without] a proper guard. I hope the waggons with Ammunit'n, &c, did not fall into the hands of the [Indians]."

== Land grants ==
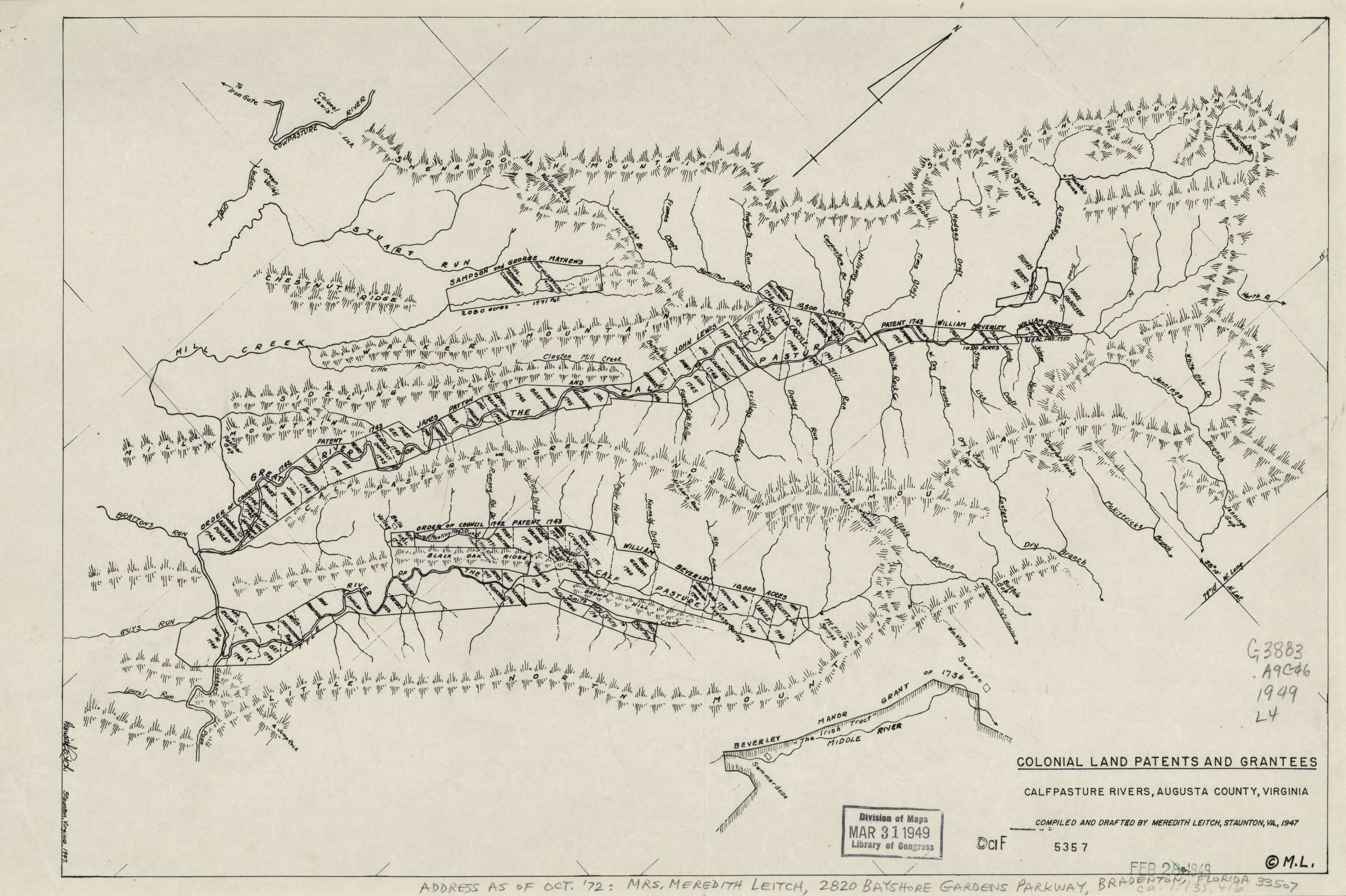
Colonial land grants in Augusta County. James Patton's grant along the Calfpasture River is shown just left of the map's center. Plots belonging to William Preston, John Lewis, and William Beverley are also marked.

In 1743, Patton applied for a grant of 200,000 acres on the "branches of the Mississippi" on the promise that he would bring one family to settle each thousand acres, however John Blair Sr. of the Virginia Council denied his request, arguing that it "might occasion a Dispute betwixt them and the French, who claimed a Right to Land on those waters." Besides, said Blair, he "could not conceive that any Benifit [sic] could arise to his Majesties Revenues or to the strength of this Colony by a handfull of Poor People that might Venture to settle there."

In 1745, Patton received a land grant of 100,000 acres, the so-called Woods River Grant, on the understanding that if he was able to attract settlers to this area, another 100,000 acres would be granted. Patton noted that the grant would, if settled, be "a usefull Barrier...between the French, French Indians & Virginia." He was able to select any land he wanted as long as it was not already part of previous grants. Patton mostly chose land in the New River Valley, although he also selected some lands on the Calfpasture River west of Beverley Manor. A proclamation in the collection of the History Museum of Western Virginia and the O. Winston Link Museum, dated 10 October 1746, declaring legal ownership of 100,000 acres in Augusta County, dictates that the owners must "settle, cultivate, improve, and be dwelling thereon" by 15 April 1748, or forfeit their ownership.

Patton decided in 1745 to form his own company, known initially as the Wood's River Company, and later as the New River Company. Among his 20 company members were John Buchanan, George Robinson, James Wood, Adam Harman, Israel Lorton, and Peter Rentfroe. Patton wanted corporate power to negotiate profitable purchases and sales and to participate in treaties with Native Americans, but the company made only a few purchases and dissolved after Patton's death in 1755.

In 1745, Patton assisted a group of German anabaptists of the Schwarzenau Brethren who established a community called Mahanaim (Dunkard's Bottom), south of Radford, on the New River. Patton had claimed this area but because the Germans were (unbeknownst to Patton) already living there, Patton was able to work out a deal so that the Germans could keep their land, 900 acres, which was surveyed by Patton's Woods River Company in 1747.

In 1748, Patton collaborated with his uncle, John Lewis, and Dr. Thomas Walker in the formation of the Loyal Land Company of Virginia. That same year, he accompanied Walker on a journey west, as far south as the "Fork Country of the Holston" (present-day Kingsport, Sullivan County, Tennessee), to survey the westernmost lands which were included as part of his 1745 land grant. Patton may have constructed a small fort in what is now Chilhowie, Virginia, likely just a blockhouse, which was converted in 1752 into the Town House, a tavern operated by Samuel Stalnaker. Due to the vague description of various land grants, the Loyal Company entered into several disputes with the Ohio Company and Patton's New River Company. Lawsuits were filed repeatedly on both sides and were only resolved with the deaths of the last surviving members of the Loyal Company in 1811.

In January 1753, Patton applied for a second land grant of 100,000 acres, but this was not immediately approved due to objections by Patton's uncle, John Lewis, and by the Ohio Company.

Patton became quite wealthy by surveying plots of land and selling them off. Between 1746 and 1754, Patton sold 31,291 acres of land, by 115 separate deeds, most of which can be found in the Library of Virginia. These sales added up to a little over £2,050, Virginia currency (equivalent to about $504,346.00 today). Much of this land had come from the 100,000 acres Patton had acquired in the 1745 Woods River Grant.

=== Homes ===
Patton's first home was a log cabin he built in 1741 at Spring Hill, on what is still known as the Patton Farm Road near present-day Stuarts Draft, Virginia. On 25 October 1746, Patton contracted Alexander Douglass, a stone mason, to build a (presumably stone) house, but for unknown reasons the house was not built, and Patton filed suit. On 15 January 1754, Patton signed a contract with two Augusta County carpenters to construct a new home for him at Spring Hill: "a solidly-made a one-room log house, twenty feet square, to include...a wooden floor, high ceiling, and spacious loft." Patton also owned a "small stone house" at Cherry Tree Bottom, across the James River from present-day Buchanan, Virginia.

=== Draper's Meadow ===
On 20 June 1753, Patton received a patent from Governor Robert Dinwiddie for a 7,500-acre tract lying on Stroubles Creek and Tom's Creek in present-day Montgomery County (which was part of Augusta County at the time). This tract had been surveyed by William Preston in January and February. The Patton Tract stretched between the future locations of Blacksburg and Prices Fork on the east and west, and Toms Creek and Prices Mountain on the north and south. The land was subdivided using the Indian Road of 1745 (corresponding to present Prices Fork Road) as a spine to either side of which smaller tracts stretched down to Stroubles and Tom's creeks.

In early 1754 Patton sold 17 subdivisions to 18 settlers, including John Draper and William Ingles, although the Drapers had established a homestead on the land as early as 1746, and William Ingles had started farming in the area after marrying Mary Draper Ingles in 1750. John Buchanan surveyed the land in October 1747, recording in his notebook: "Surveyed for James Patton Seven Thousand five Hundred acres of Land in Augusta County, part of an order of Council granted to ye said Patton &c. to take up 100,000 acres, Lying on the west side of the Ridge that parts ye waters of Roanoke from those of the new River (at a place called Drapers)." A modern-day estimate of this tract shows it is closer to 10,000 acres, and Patton and Buchanan may have underreported the acreage to pay a smaller quitrent.

== Representative at Native American treaties ==
=== Treaty of Lancaster, 1744 ===
Patton was a witness but not a signatory to the 1744 Treaty of Lancaster, which paid the Six Nations four hundred pounds in gold and goods, in exchange for which the Iroquois renounced claims on all lands in the Colony of Virginia and accepted the King of England as their monarch. The treaty promised the Iroquois "a marked path up the Valley," which, as the commissioners stated, "shall be the established Road, for the Indians our Brethren of the Six Nations, to pass to the Southward, when there is War between them and the Catawbas." Preparations began immediately to construct a road connecting western Virginia with Maryland and Pennsylvania, later known as the Valley Pike.

=== Cherokee conference, 1751 ===
In July 1751, Cherokee chief Attakullakulla and a party of thirty or forty Cherokees traveled from East Tennessee to meet Patton, anxious to improve trade relations with the Colony of Virginia, as trade routes to South Carolina were stretched thin and French goods were too costly. Patton took a delegation of Cherokees to Williamsburg where they met with acting governor Lewis Burwell. After several weeks of negotiations, the Virginia Council accepted a trade agreement, and Patton escorted Attakullakulla and the others homewards, reaching the Tennessee border in September.

=== Logstown Treaty Conference, 1752 ===
In June 1752, the British held a council at Logstown with representatives of the Six Nations, and the Lenape and Shawnee who had been tributary to them. Colonel Joshua Fry, James Patton, and Lunsford Lomax represented the Colony of Virginia, and Christopher Gist, Thomas Lee, William Trent, and William Beverley represented the Ohio Company. The purpose of this treaty was to confirm and clarify the agreements made at the 1744 Treaty of Lancaster. William Preston accompanied Patton as his personal secretary. Patton kept a journal of the conference (now lost), in which he recorded the speeches of Chief Oconostota.

== Roadbuilding in the Shenandoah Valley ==
In May 1745, James Patton and his future son-in-law John Buchanan conducted a survey for "a Road from the County line of Frederick [County] to the upper Inhabitants of Augusta [County] on Woods River." They began laying out the road through the Shenandoah Valley from Winchester to Staunton and later down to Roanoke and what would become Blacksburg. Initially known as the "Indian Road" because parts of it followed the Great Indian Warpath, it was incorporated into the "Great Wagon Road" which ran from Knoxville, Tennessee to Philadelphia. Money was appropriated by the House of Burgesses to pay for construction, and work crews were assigned to work on sections of road leading to and from their communities. Between 1747 and 1754, Patton supervised work crews in building roads and bridges up and down the Shenandoah Valley. Parts of Patton's original road later became U.S. Route 11 in Virginia and other parts follow Virginia State Route 42.

== Election to the House of Burgesses, 1753 ==
In 1753, James Patton was chosen to succeed John Madison to represent Augusta County in the Virginia House of Burgesses, when Madison left his seat to serve as county coroner. Patton served during 1754 and until his death in 1755. It is unknown whether anyone was elected in his place.

== Marriages and family ==
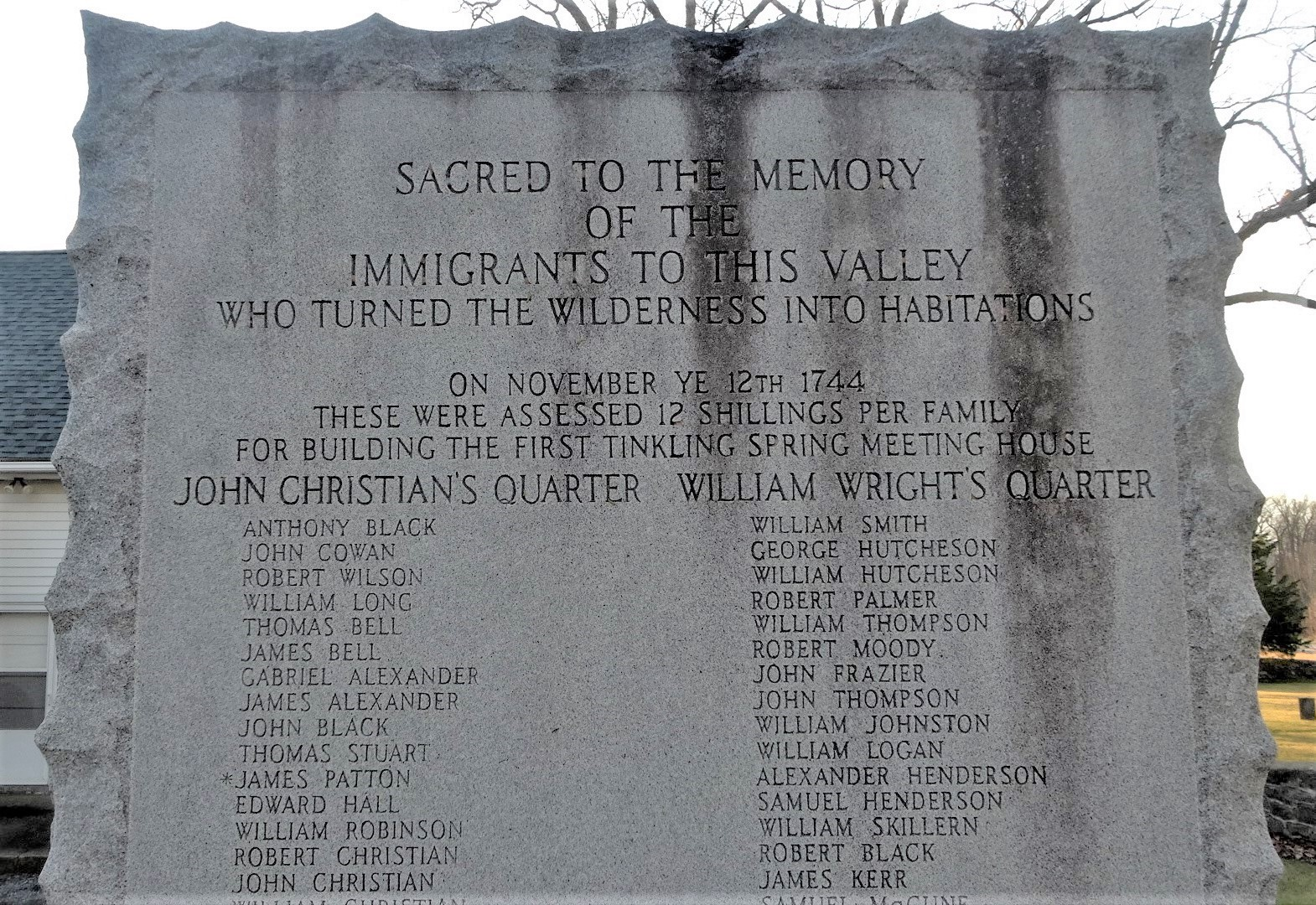
Monument to immigrants at Tinkling Spring Presbyterian Church, showing James Patton's name at the bottom left.

There is some evidence that Patton's first wife, Ally, died in June 1728 and is buried at St. Nicholas' Church in Whitehaven. Several women have been named as Patton's second wife, including Mary Beverley (daughter of William Beverley), Mary Borden or Burden, and also Mary Osborn or Osborne. Richard Osborn claims to have found evidence in the Colonial Office Records and Virginia Shipping Returns that Patton brought his wife Mary Osborne, and their daughters, from Whitehaven to Virginia in 1738. He had two daughters, Mary (who married William Thompson) and Margaret (who married John Buchanan). A son, John, was born in 1734 and died in infancy.

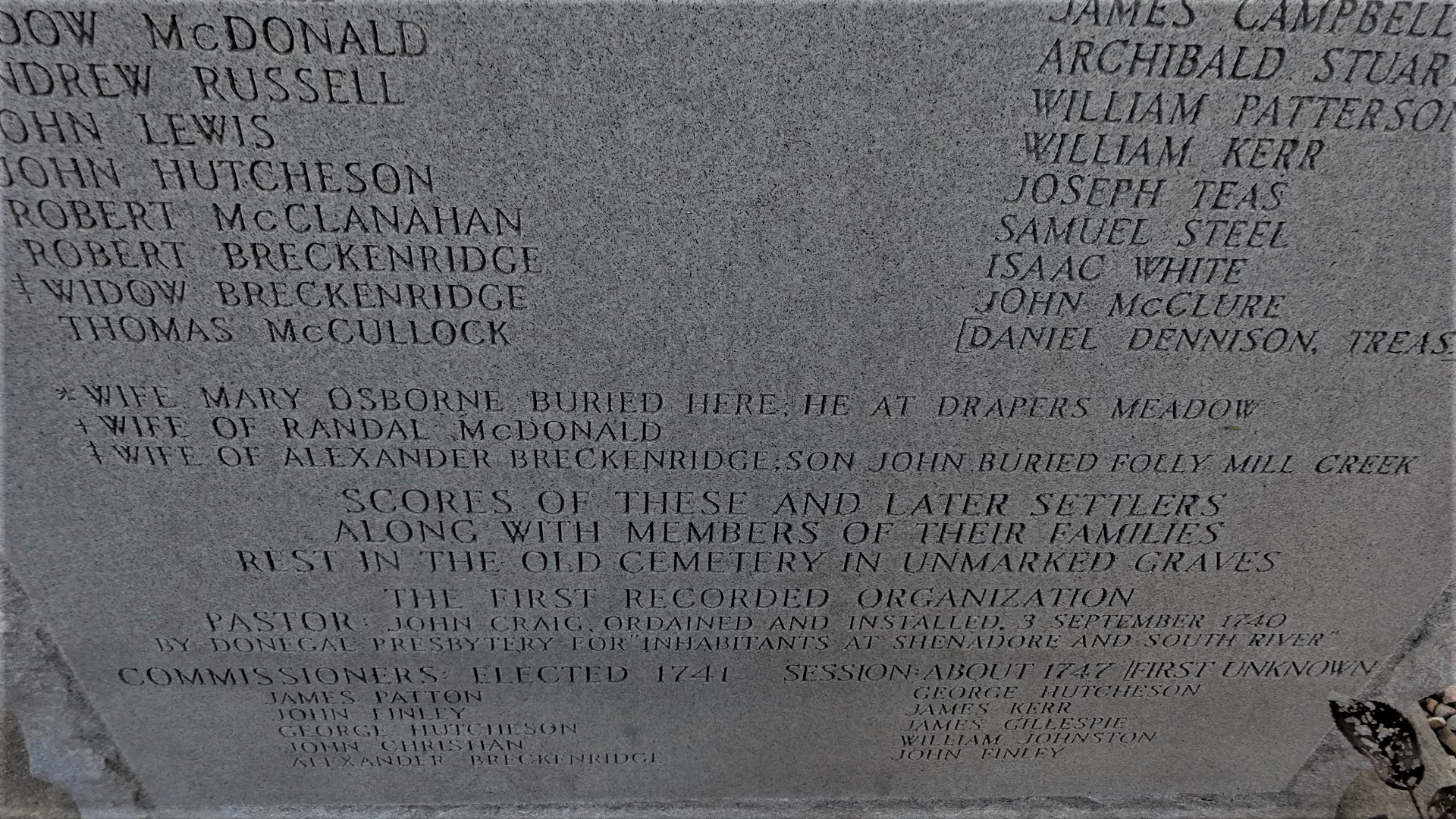
Tinkling Spring monument, bottom, naming his wife Mary Osborne, and indicating that Patton is buried at Draper's Meadow.

Patton's wife is not mentioned by name in his will, aside from a request that he be buried beside her: "My body I commit to Providence, but if convenient to where I resign my last breath, to be buried at the Tinkling Spring, where my wife now lays." The will was executed on 1 September 1750, therefore she died prior to that date. A commemorative stone at the Tinkling Spring Presbyterian Church identifies Patton's wife as Mary Osborne, and notes that Patton is buried at Draper's Meadow: "Wife Mary Osborne buried here. He at Draper's Meadow."

As he had no sons, Patton took much interest in the education of his nephew, William Preston. Patton needed a trustworthy surveyor to accurately measure and record his vast holdings and to divide plots up for sale to settlers, therefore he arranged for William to be apprenticed to Thomas Lewis, the County Surveyor and Patton's cousin, and in November 1752 Preston was hired as a deputy surveyor. He later served as surveyor in Augusta, Botetourt, Fincastle, and Montgomery Counties. Starting in 1751, Preston surveyed 36 tracts for Patton along the New River.

== Death and burial, 1755 ==
After the Braddock Expedition ended in the defeat of British forces at the Battle of the Monongahela on 9 July 1755, Native American warriors began raiding British settlements in Pennsylvania and Virginia. Realizing the danger to Draper's Meadow, a vulnerable settlement on the New River, Patton brought a supply of gunpowder from Williamsburg, arriving on 29 July with his nephew William Preston, accompanied by a convoy of militia. For reasons that remain unclear, the convoy stayed at another location some five miles distant, and Patton chose to stay at the home of William Ingles to rest and complete some correspondence. Early the next morning, Patton sent Preston to assist Phillip Lybrook with the harvest at Sinking Creek, so Preston was not at Draper's Meadow when it was attacked. On Wednesday, 30 July, Shawnee warriors raided the settlement. (Note: Letitia Preston Floyd and John P. Hale give 8 July 1755 as the date of the Draper's Meadow Massacre in which Patton was killed, but 30 July is more likely the correct date, as documents confirm that Patton was in Williamsburg on 8 July. The 8 August article in the Virginia Gazette announcing Patton's death reports that it took place on "the last day of July." Preston's Register gives the date unequivocally as 30 July.)

Letitia Preston Floyd described Patton's death in an 1843 letter to her son:

After breakfast Col. Patton had sat down to his table to write. The Indian war-hoop was heard and some five or six of the[m] surrounded the cabin to set it on fire. The colonel always kept his sword on the table, he rushed to the door with it in hand and encountered two of them. (Patton was almost gigantic in size.) He cut two of them down, in the meantime another warrior had leveled his gun, fired, and killed the brave old pioneer – Patton fell.

Patton's death was reported in an article in the Virginia Gazette on 8 August 1755:

"By an Express this Morning from Augusta County, we have the melancholy Account of the Murder of Col. James Patton, who was killed by a Party of Indians, the last Day of July, on the Head Branches of Roanoke, and eight more Men, Women, and Children. Col. Patton was going out with Ammunition &c. for the Use of the Frontier Inhabitants, and stopping at a Plantation on the Road to refresh himself, the Convoy being about five Miles before, he was beset by 16 Indians, who killed, and stripped him, and then made off with his Horse &c."

Joseph A. Waddell states that Patton was buried in an unmarked grave at Draper's Meadow:

"It was impossible at that day to transport a corpse from [Draper's Meadow] to Tinkling Spring. He was buried near the spot where he 'resigned his last breath,' and his grave was covered with loose stones. There is no slab or inscription. An idle report arose that a large amount of money was buried with the body, and the grave was desecrated a few years ago by vandals in search of the treasure."

Letitia Preston Floyd reported in her 1843 letter that when William Preston and Phillip Lybrook returned to Draper's Meadow, on either the same day or the next day, "they found Patton, Mrs. Draper, the mother of Mrs. Ingles, and the children buried." The location of the graves of James Patton and others killed in the massacre remains unknown, but it is believed to be in the vicinity of the Duck Pond on the campus of Virginia Tech. There is no record of their burial site among documents by William Preston and members of his family.

== Memorialization ==
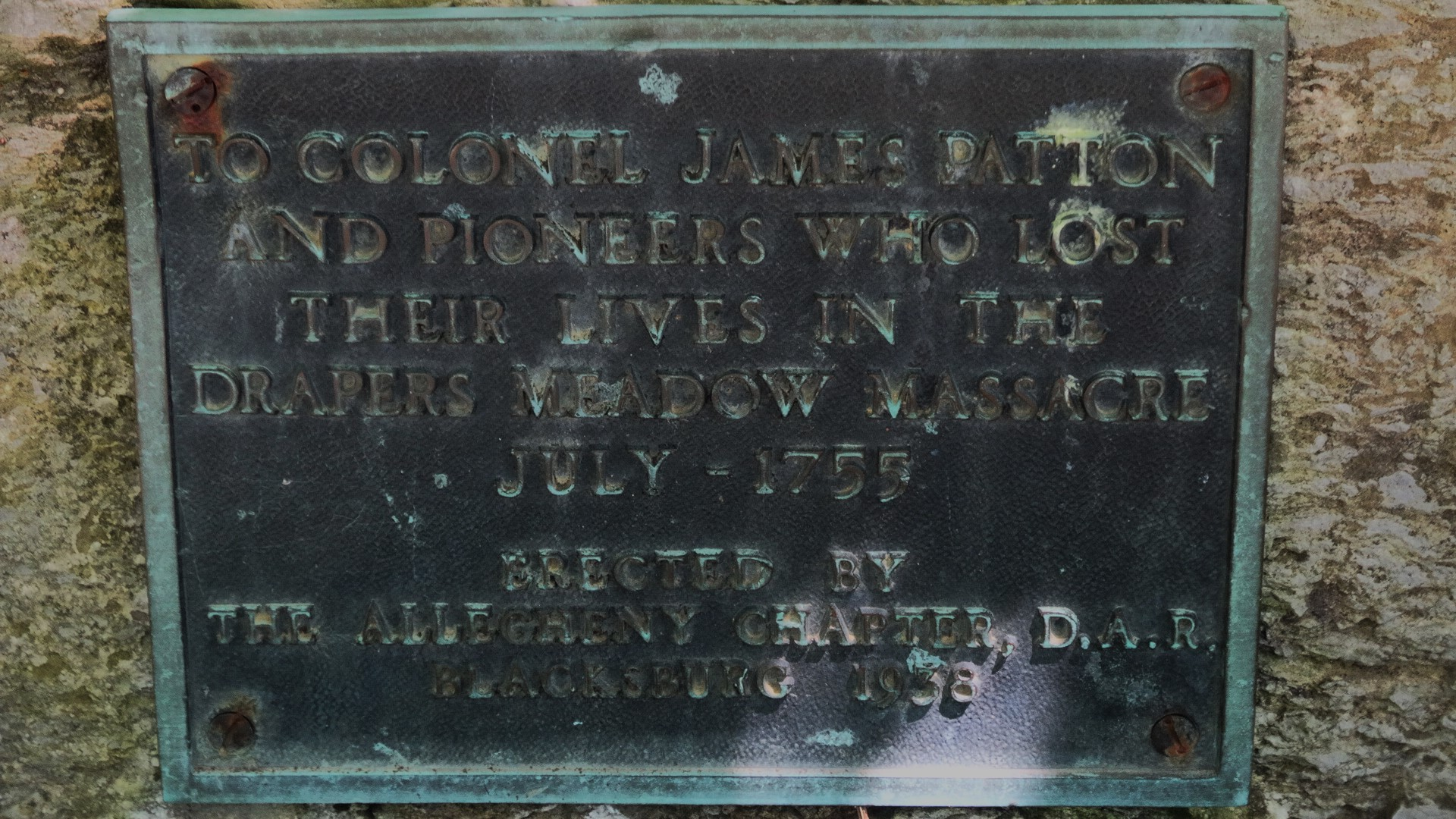
Memorial plaque to Colonel James Patton and pioneers killed at Draper's Meadow Massacre.

The town of Pattonsburg was named after James Patton during the 19th century. It was later incorporated into the town of Buchanan, Virginia, named after Patton's son-in-law, John Buchanan.

William Preston's son James Patton Preston, who served as Governor of Virginia during 1816–1819, was named for James Patton.

In 1938, the Alleghany Chapter of the National Society Daughters of the American Revolution (NSDAR) placed a brass memorial plaque at Smithfield Plantation, near the site of the Draper's Meadow Massacre in Blacksburg, on the Virginia Tech campus, on which is written: "To Colonel James Patton and pioneers who lost their lives in the Draper's Meadow Massacre, July 1755."

== Sources ==
Biographical information about Patton's early life is largely based on family traditions, written family histories, and genealogical studies based on those traditions and histories, with little or no reliable documentation. An official biography by Patricia Givens Johnson extracts information from documents collected by Preston Davie and by Lyman Draper but is often uncritical, sometimes "recording family tradition as fact." Summaries of the Lyman Draper document collection can be found in Quaife.

A frequently cited source is an 1843 letter to her son Rush, by Letitia Preston Floyd (daughter of William Preston, Patton's nephew), written at the request of historian Lyman Draper and containing a brief biography of Patton and a description of his death. Preston Davie (a descendant who spent many years collecting documents in an attempt to establish James Patton's genealogy) dismissed the letter as "replete with errors...Indeed some of the events as described in this letter are such a jumble of inaccurate hearsay and fact as to make them more imaginative than real." Glanville and Mays counter this opinion: "The overall accuracy of Mrs. Floyd’s 'My Dear Rush' letter is surprisingly good...She made minor errors in dates and places. However, it seems to us that Mrs. Floyd did remarkably well for a person aged 63 who was often writing of events about which she learned four or five decades earlier."

Glanville and Mays have attempted to uncover primary sources to reveal reliable information about Patton's life and activities.

== See also ==
- Draper's Meadow Massacre
- William Preston (Virginia soldier)
- William Beverley
- John Buchanan (Virginia colonist)
- John Lewis (Virginia colonist)
