= Tanasi =

Historic Cherokee village in Tennessee, USA

- Chota and Tanasi Cherokee Village Sites
- U.S. National Register of Historic Places
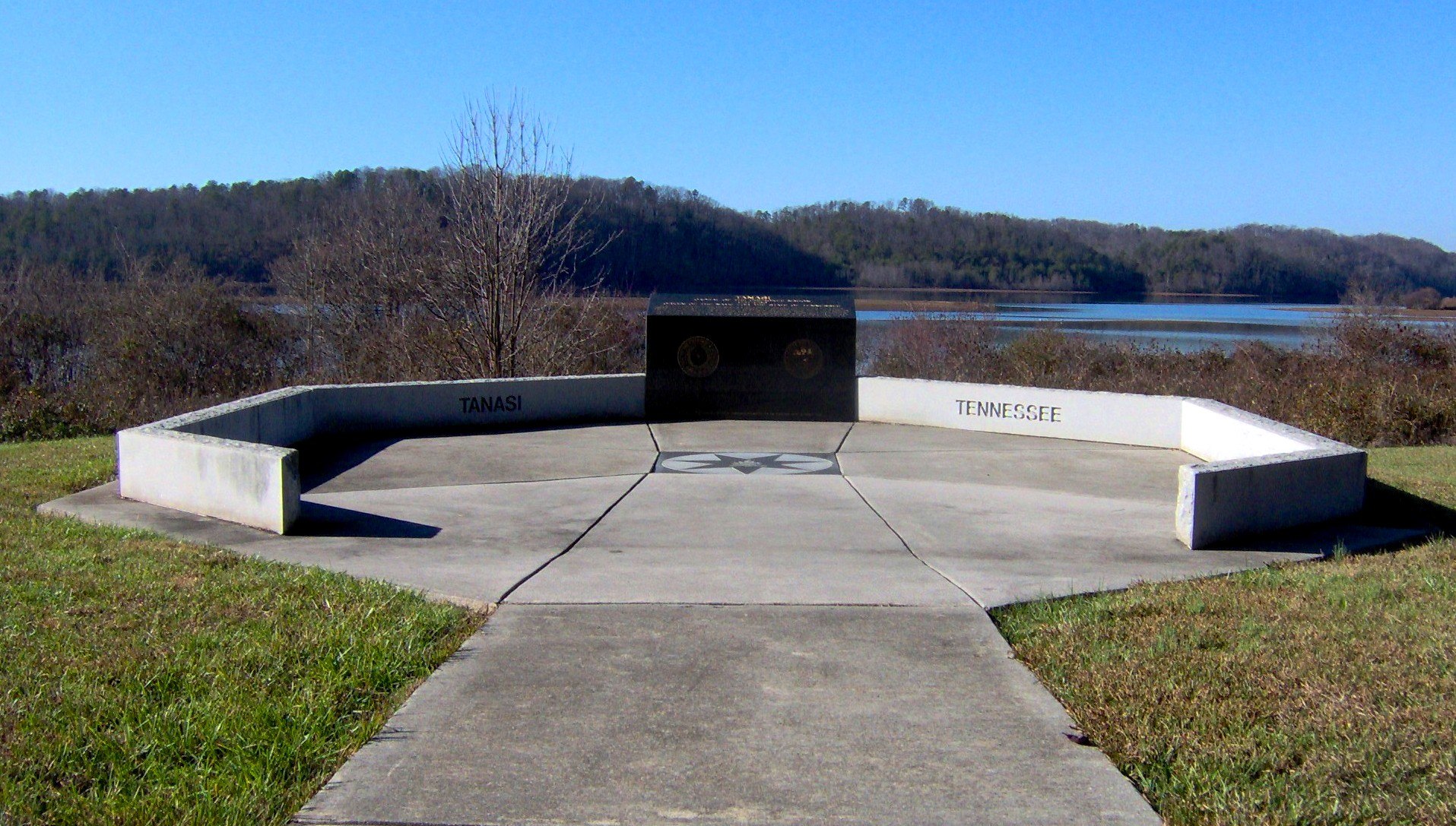
- Monument overlooking the Tanasi site
- Location: Monroe County, Tennessee
- Nearest city: Vonore
- Coordinates: 35.5486°N 84.1324°W
- Built: c. 1600–1700 A.D.
- NRHP reference No.: 73001813
- Added to NRHP: 1973

Tanasi (Cherokee: ᏔᎾᏏ, romanized: Tanasi; also rendered Tanase, Tenasi, Tenassee, Tunissee, Tennessee, and other such variations) was a historic Overhill settlements site in present-day Monroe County, Tennessee, in the southeastern United States. The village became the namesake for the state of Tennessee. It was abandoned by the Cherokee in the 19th century for a rising town whose chief was more powerful. Tanasi served as the de facto capital of the Overhill Cherokee from as early as 1721 until 1730, when the capital shifted to Great Tellico.

The Cherokee town of Chota developed immediately north of and later than Tanasi. The two sites were divided by an unnamed stream. By the 1740s, Chota had become the more prominent of the two towns, holding the townhouse where the community met, and chiefs would meet with colonial emissaries. Although Chota and Tanasi had distinct political, social, and demographic traits, research excavators in the late 1960s determined that the two towns are archaeologically indistinguishable. They were among the numerous Overhill Towns, as called by English colonists, who traveled over the Appalachian Mountains from the east to reach them. The two towns are grouped as a single listing on the National Register of Historic Places, although Tanasi was given its own site designation (40MR62) in 1972.

Both sites were submerged by the creation of Tellico Reservoir, after completion of a dam on the Little Tennessee River in 1979. Archeological surveys were conducted of these sites in the 1970s prior to their flooding, and thousands of artifacts were recovered.

In the 1980s, the Tennessee Valley Authority placed a monument on the shoreline above the submerged site of Tanasi that commemorates its history and its legacy as the origin of the name Tennessee. This monument is approximately 7 miles (11 km) southeast of Vonore, just off Highway 455 (Citico Road). The site is managed by the Eastern Band of the Cherokee Nation.

== Geography ==
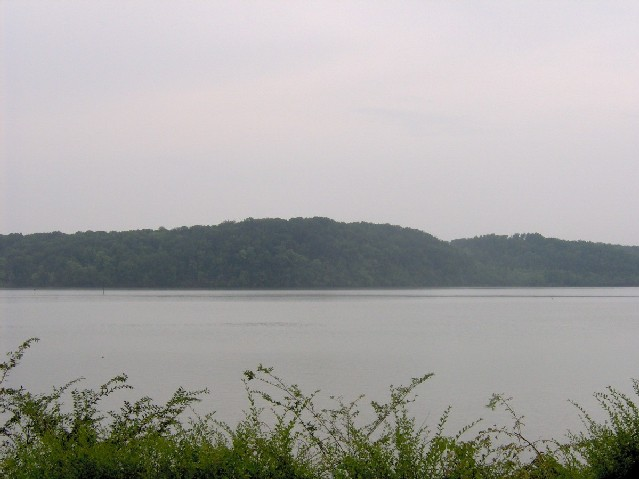
The Tanasi site, looking northwest from the Tanasi monument

The Little Tennessee River flows northwestward from North Carolina from its source in the Appalachian Mountains in Georgia. It traverses a 40-mile (64 km) stretch of northern Monroe County before emptying into the Tennessee River near Lenoir City. In 1979, the construction of Tellico Dam at the mouth of the river created a reservoir that spans the lower 33 miles (53 km) of the Little Tennessee and the lower 22 miles (35 km) of its tributary, the Tellico River, flooding former important Cherokee town sites. Tanasi was located along the west bank of the Little Tennessee 27 miles (43 km) upstream from the river's mouth. The site was opposite a sharp bend in the river known as Bacon's Bend.

Tanasi was situated on a relatively flat terrace flanked by the river on one side and a series of high, steep hills on the other. These hills, noted on Timberlake's 1762 map, are part of the Appalachian Ridge-and-Valley Province, which spans much of the upper Tennessee Valley. The Appalachian Range proper rises a few miles south of the Chota-Tanasi site.

== History ==
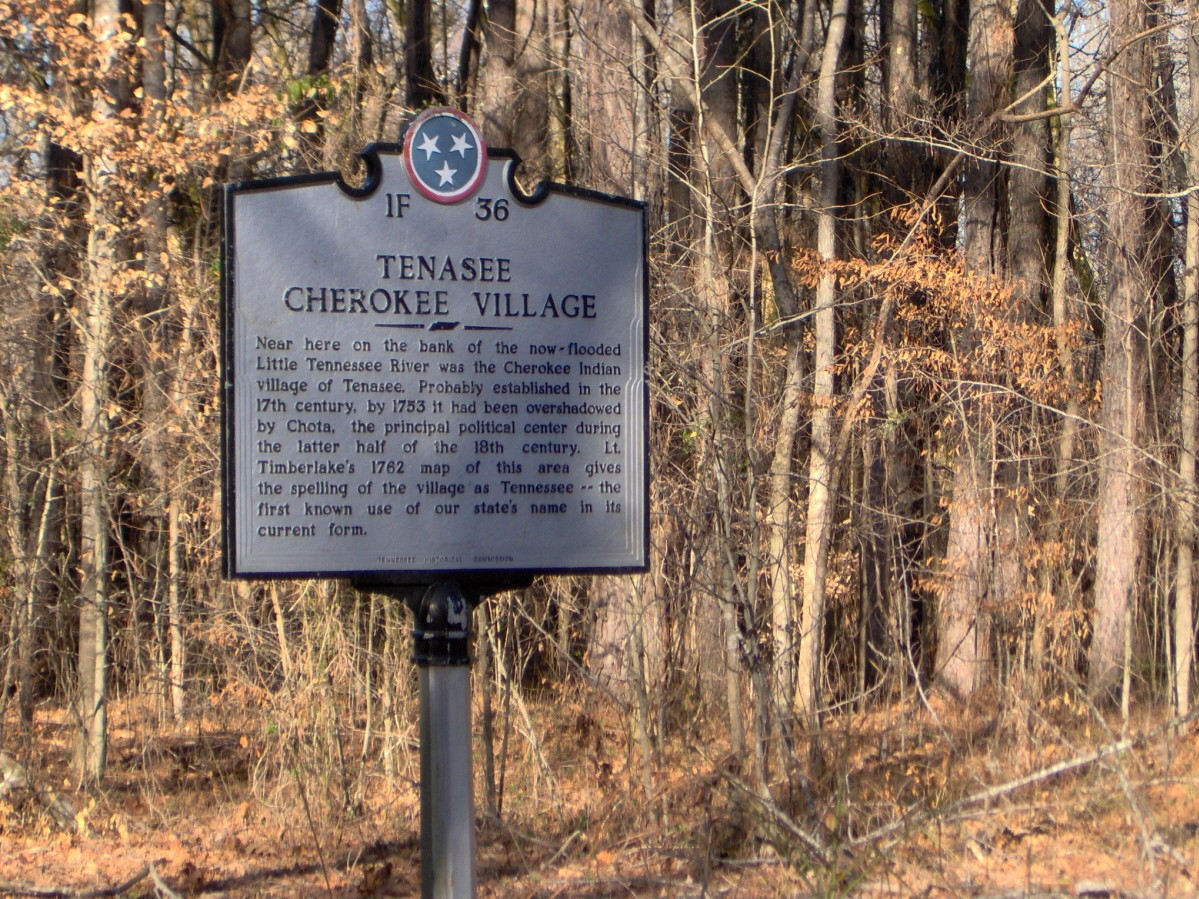
Tennessee Historical Commission marker along Citico Road

Tanasi first appears in the historical record in the early 18th century, at a time when the fur trade between the English and the Cherokee had grown to the extent that the colonists wanted to regulate it. Ethnologist James Mooney reported that the meaning of the town's name is unknown, but noted that it was used for other places among Cherokee lands in Tennessee and North Carolina. The Cherokee name for the river upon which Tanasi was situated was probably Callamaco. Early Euro-American explorers and traders renamed the river after Tanasi.

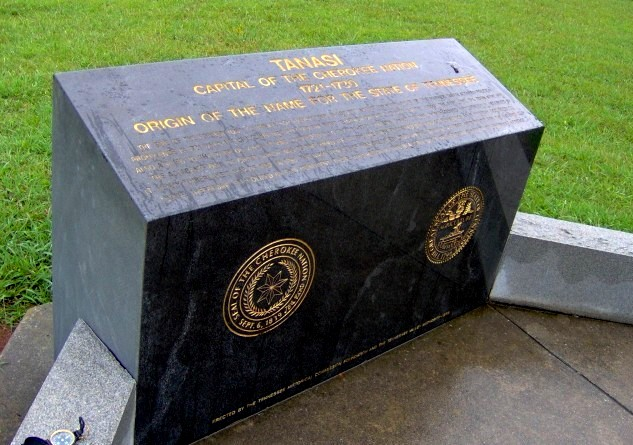
Tanasi monument, up close

Among the earliest English traders to reside at Tanasi was Eleazar Wiggan— nicknamed "Old Rabbit" by the Cherokee— who operated out of Tanasi as early as 1711. He also served as a guide for later colonial diplomats and emissaries.

In 1725, the province of South Carolina dispatched Colonel George Chicken to Tanasi to obtain Cherokee assistance in the colony's struggles with the Creek. Chicken indicated in his journals that the chief of Tanasi— known as the Tanasi Warrior or Head Warrior of Tanasi— ruled over the Cherokee Overhill, Middle, and Valley towns in the region. (But this would have been unusual. The designation of Middle and Valley Towns generally referred to groups of towns on the eastern side of the Appalachians in Western North Carolina. Kituwa was chief among the Middle Towns. Not only was Cherokee society highly decentralized and the towns generally exercised considerable autonomy under their own chiefs, but travel between these territories was difficult in the mountainous region.) Chicken recorded a speech in which the Tanasi Warrior pledged support for the English. The two later engaged in a pipe-smoking session in which the Tanasi Warrior told Chicken of recent Creek hostilities in the area. Colonel John Herbert visited Tanasi on a similar mission in 1727 and reported meeting with the "King and Long Warriour" of Tanasi at the Cherokee townhouse.

In 1730, Sir Alexander Cuming, a trader claiming to be an emissary of King George II, journeyed to Tanasi and obtained the Tanasi Warrior's allegiance for England. As evidence of his success, Cuming sought an esteemed symbolic headdress known as the Crown of Tanasi— described as resembling a wig made of dyed possum hair— which he hoped to present to the king of England. To obtain this headdress, Cuming enlisted the aid of Moytoy, chief of Great Tellico. Cuming used his flamboyance to convince the Cherokee to crown Moytoy "Emperor of the Cherokee." In exchange, Moytoy obtained the headdress sought by Cuming. Cuming departed for England shortly thereafter, taking with him a party that included Eleazar Wiggan, future Cherokee leader Attakullakulla, and two Tanasi warriors named Clogoittah and Oukanaekah to present to the king.

The crowning of Moytoy in 1730 shifted the Cherokee center of power to Great Tellico, which was situated along the Tellico River roughly 16 miles (26 km) southwest of Tanasi. After the death of Moytoy in 1741, however, Old Hop, the chief of Chota, began to consolidate power. The influence of Chota soon overshadowed that of Tanasi, and by the early 1750s, Chota had become the more dominant town. In 1765, Henry Timberlake, who had visited the Overhill towns as an emissary in 1761–1762, reported 12 dwellings and 21 warriors at Tanasi, and identified Old Hop as chief of both Chota and Tanasi. In 1775, the Tanasi Warrior was among the chiefs who signed a treaty with the Watauga Association of Carolina colonists, who wanted to create an independent jurisdiction west of the mountains, in what became Tennessee.

=== Tanasi's relationship with Chota ===
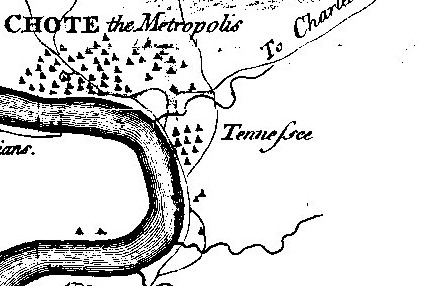
Detail of Tanasi (spelled "Tennessee"), as shown on Henry Timberlake's 1765 "Draught of the Cherokee Country"

Tanasi's relationship with Chota has long puzzled historians and archaeologists. Some have speculated that the two towns were a single community with two districts and two governments, not unlike the situation that reportedly existed in Great Tellico and Chatuga around the same time. Archeological excavators in the early 1970s noted virtually no differences in the types of cultural materials and features uncovered at the two village sites, which had developed on either side of a creek. 18th-century traders and diplomats, however, clearly identified these as two separate towns.

Tanasi was reported by Euro-American traders from their first explorations in the region in the early 18th century, but Chota does not appear in the historical record until around 1745. The maps of John Herbert and George Hunter, drawn in 1727 and 1730, respectively, show Tanasi but not Chota. In 1746, English agent George Pawley met with Cherokee leaders at the Chota townhouse, indicating Chota had usurped Tanasi as the more dominant town. Missionary William Richardson visited the Overhill towns in the late 1750s and described Chota and Tanasi as being separated by a "small river." Richardson's description is supported by Timberlake's 1762 map, which recorded the two towns' sites.

== Archaeological findings ==
Cyrus Thomas, working for the Smithsonian Institution's Bureau of Ethnology in the late 1880s, conducted a mound survey at the Chota-Tanasi site. Thomas reported the discovery of 13 burials and several artifacts.

In 1939, Thomas Lewis and Madeline Kneburg directed an excavation at the Chota-Tanasi site with funding by the Works Progress Administration to pay for laborers. Lewis and Kneburg, who were searching for cultural data with which to compare their earlier finds at Hiwassee Island, uncovered 22 burials, 85 pit features, 982 postmolds, and one structure.

With the sites threatened by flooding from a dam and reservoir project, between 1969 and 1974, University of Tennessee archaeologists conducted excavations at the Chota-Tanasi site to establish history and recover as many artifacts as possible. Two excavations—one in 1970 and one in 1972—were focused specifically on Tanasi.

Although artifacts dating to the Archaic period (and even a fluted projectile point dating to the Paleo-Indian period) were uncovered at the Chota-Tanasi sites, the excavations were focused mostly on the period of Cherokee occupation. Investigators hoped to identify the locations of each town and to find evidence that might define the Cherokee peoples' relationship to those occupying the area in the South Appalachian Mississippian culture-era (c. 1000–1600 A.D.).

The 1972 excavations uncovered 191 features, 22 burials, 1005 postmolds, and 6 structures at the Tanasi site alone. Two townhouses were uncovered at the Chota-Tanasi sites, one of which was slightly smaller and older than the other. The older of the two townhouses may have been the Tanasi townhouse, which traders and emissaries had reported in the 1720s. However, it is also possible that the older townhouse was an earlier version of the Chota townhouse, and that excavators failed to uncover the Tanasi townhouse. The older townhouse had a diameter of just over 50 feet (15 m). In 1986, the remains of the 22 burials uncovered at Tanasi—along with those uncovered at Chota—were reinterred in a burial mound at the Sequoyah Museum near Vonore.

== Resources ==
- "History and Genealogy:Frequently Asked Questions "What is the meaning of the name 'Tennessee'?"". Tennessee State Library and Archives.
- "History". Smoky Mountain Visitors Guide. Archived from the original on March 7, 2010.
- Mooney, James. "Myths of the Cherokee" (1900, reprint 1995).
