= Moytoy =

Moytoy was a word used by the Cherokee, but it's unknown if it was a title or a personal name. It can refer to:

- Moytoy of Tellico, recognized by Great Britain as "Emperor of the Cherokee"
- Moytoy of Citico
