= Stalking Turkey =

Stalking Turkey has referred in English accounts to two Cherokee leaders:

- Oconostota (c. 1710 – 1783), a skiagusta of Chota and the First Beloved Man of the Cherokee from 1775 to 1781
- Kanagatucko (died 1760) (Standing Turkey), a Cherokee elder, serving briefly as the First Beloved Man of the Cherokee from 1753 until his death in 1760
