= Moytoy of Tellico =

Cherokee leader (c.1687–1741)

- Born: c. 1687; Tellico, Cherokee Lands
- Died: 1741
- Title: First Beloved Man of the Cherokee; Emperor of the Cherokee
- Successor: Amouskositte

Moytoy of Tellico (died 1741), also known as Amatoya Moytoy Kanagaota, was a leader of the Cherokee.

== Titles ==
Moytoy was given the title of "Emperor of the Cherokee" by Sir Alexander Cumming, a Scots-Anglo trade envoy in what was then the Province of South Carolina, and is regularly referred to as "King" in official English reports, as this was a familiar term of rank to colonists. He was from Great Tellico, an historic Cherokee town in what is now Tennessee.

In 1730 Cumming, a Scottish adventurer with ties to the colonial government of South Carolina, arranged for Moytoy to be crowned emperor over all of the Cherokee towns in a ceremony intended to appeal to Cumming's colonial sponsors. The Cherokee was crowned in the town of Nikwasi with a headdress referred to as the "Crown of Tannassy." Cumming arranged to take Moytoy and a group of Cherokee to England to meet King George II. Moytoy declined to go, saying that his wife was ill. Attakullakulla (Little Carpenter) volunteered to go in his place. The Cherokee laid the "Crown" at King George's feet, along with four scalps.

== Family ==
His wife's name was Quatsy "Quatsie" of Tellico, according to genealogical sources. After the death of Moytoy, his son, Amouskositte, tried to succeed him as "Emperor". However, by 1753 Conocotocko (Old Hop) of Chota in the Overhill Towns had emerged as the dominant leader in the area. Some modern sources have stated that Moytoy of Tellico was the uncle of Moytoy of Citico, but there appears to be no historical references for this information.

== Etymology ==
The origin and true meaning of Moytoy's name is unknown. While many modern sources have suggested that it comes from the Tsalagi (Cherokee) word "A-Ma-Do-Ya" and this means "rainmaker," this seems to be a poor translation popularized in unsourced books from the mid-1900s. In the Cherokee language, "A-Ma" means "water" and "Do-Ya" means beaver.

Many other unsourced translations have also been suggested such as "A-Ma" in Cherokee meaning "water," and the French word "Matai" meaning "to master," but this also appears to be an incorrect French translation. It's also not clear that the Cherokee adopted French words to this degree at the time. The names "Amo-adaw-ehi" or "Amo-adawehi" have also been suggested as a Cherokee name for both chief Moytoys, but the source or translation of these names are also not clear.

The word "Amatoya" or any similar names in reference to a chief Moytoy do not appear to have been used in writing prior to the mid-1900s in James P. Brown's books, and none of these books contain a source for this translation. No earlier sources appear to link either Moytoy of Tellico or Moytoy of Citico to any of these modern translations of his name.

Modern sources also claim that "Moytoy" was a Cherokee family name that became a title that was passed down by fathers, but there is no historical evidence of this. It seems this myth was most likely created in the late 1900s to link a few unsourced family trees to a Cherokee chief. Instead the evidence is clear that in Cherokee culture everything was passed down through the mother instead, and titles passing from father to son at the time are unlikely.

James Mooney provides a very different translation for "rain-maker" in his books on the Cherokee that were well researched in the late 1800s while living among the Cherokee. The translation he provides is "a'nigani'ski." As the Cherokee language has slightly changed over time, this translation is also more likely to be correct for the time Moytoy of Tellico lived than more modern translations.

It's also likely this name was misspelled as it was only written down by English sources. It's not possible to write this name with the Cherokee Syllabary as it uses unusual vowel sounds for the Cherokee language.

== Wampum Belts ==
One of the seven sacred wampum belts still in the possession of the Western Cherokee has the large initials A.M. at one end. The other end has a large square feature that is often seen on wampum belts that are commemorating treaties. There is a very long white "path" connecting the two ends possibly referring to the great distance that separates the two parties. It is possible that this is the belt that is mentioned in and that commemorates the treaty between the British and Amatoya Moytoy (A.M.) in 1730 (Articles of Friendship and Commerce). The Cherokees who are in possession of the belt, however, give a very different interpretation of its meaning. The name "Amatoya Moytoy" also doesn't seem to be used in historical references to this leader before the mid-1900s.

Preceded by Wrosetasatow	First Beloved Man; 1730–1741	Succeeded by Amouskositte
