= Conocotocko II =

Leader of the Cherokee

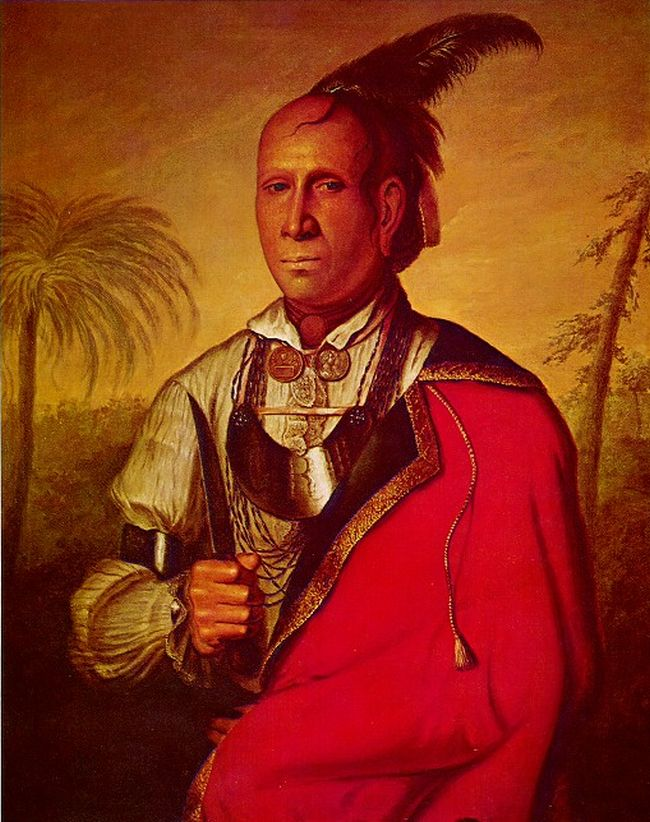
Cunne Shote, Cherokee Chief, by Francis Parsons (English), 1762, oil on canvas, Gilcrease Museum

Conocotocko (Note: Conocotocko and his uncle Conocotocko I bore the same name. Conley's Cherokee Encyclopedia says the name "has suffered perhaps the worst indignities of any Cherokee name of this period" due to its many and sometimes aberrant spellings. Spelling variations include Canackte, Canacaught, Canacackte, Canacockte, Caneecatee, Cannacaughte, Conarcortuker, Concauchto, Connagatucheo, Connecocartee, Connecorte, Connecortee, Connecote, Connetarke, Connocotte, Connocte, Conocortee, Conocotocho, Conogotocke, Conocotocko, Conogotocho, Conogotocka, Conogotocke, Conogotocko, Conogtoco, Cunigatogae, Cunnacatoque, Cunnicatoque, Guhna-gadoga, Kanagagot, Kanagagota, Kanagataucko, Kanagatoga, Kana-gatoga, Kanagatucko, Kanetekoka, and Kunagadoga.) /ˌkʌnəkəˈtoʊkoʊ/ (Cherokee: ᎬᎾᎦᏙᎦ, romanized: Gvnagadoga, "Standing Turkey"), also known by the folk-etymologized name Cunne Shote, (Note: Cunne Shote is a corruption of his Cherokee name mistakenly based on French Chote, "Chota" (the de facto capital of the Cherokee).) was First Beloved Man of the Cherokee from 1760. He succeeded his uncle Conocotocko I (or "Old Hop") upon the latter's death. Pro-French like his uncle, he steered the Cherokee into war with the British colonies of South Carolina, North Carolina, and Virginia in the aftermath of the execution of several Cherokee leaders who were being held hostage at Fort Prince George. He held his title until the end of the Anglo-Cherokee War in 1761, when he was deposed in favor of Attakullakulla.

Standing Turkey was one of three Cherokee leaders to go with Henry Timberlake to London in 1762-1763, the others being Ostenaco and Pouting Pigeon.

In 1782, he was one of a party of Cherokee which joined the Delaware, Shawnee, and Chickasaw in a diplomatic visit to the Spanish at Fort St. Louis in seeking a new avenue of obtaining arms and other assistance in the prosecution of their ongoing conflict with the Americans in the Ohio Valley. The group of Cherokee led by Standing Turkey sought and received permission to settle in Spanish Louisiana, in the region of the White River.

== Bibliography ==
- Brown, John P. (1938). Old Frontiers: The Story of the Cherokee Indians from Earliest Times to the Date of Their Removal to the West, 1838. Kingsport: Southern Publishers.
- "Cherokee". Museum of the Cherokee Indian. 1978.
- Conley, Robert J. (2007). "Guhna-gadoga". A Cherokee Encyclopedia. Albuquerque: University of New Mexico Press. ISBN 9780826339515.
- "Francis Parsons (18th century): Cunne Shote, 1762, Oil (0176.1015)". American Scene. V. 18–19. Thomas Gilcrease Museum Association. 1977.
- Nies, Judith (1996). Native American History: A Chronology of the Vast Achievements and a Culture and Their Links to World Events. New York: Ballantine Books. ISBN 978-0-307-81405-0.
- Tanner, Helen Hornbeck (1978). "Cherokees in the Ohio Country". Journal of Cherokee Studies. 3 (2): 95–103.

== See also ==
- Anglo-Cherokee War
