= Amouskositte =

Cherokee leader

Amouskositte (fl. 1741–1753), recorded in colonial documents under spellings such as Ammonscossitte and referred to by the British as the "Young Emperor", was an 18th-century Overhill Cherokee figure from the town of Great Tellico, in present-day Tennessee. The son of Moytoy of Tellico, he was recognized by officials of the Province of South Carolina as "Emperor of the Cherokee" after his father's death in 1741. Because he was young and Cherokee political authority was decentralized among autonomous towns, the title carried little practical weight, and by 1753 leadership among the Overhill Cherokee had passed to Kanagatucko (Old Hop) of Chota.

== Background and succession ==
The "Emperor" title that Amouskositte inherited had arisen from British attempts to deal with a single recognized Cherokee authority; the Cherokee themselves were organized around autonomous towns and councils of older men rather than a hereditary monarchy. His father, Moytoy of Tellico, had been treated as "Emperor" in connection with the 1730 dealings between the Cherokee and the British Crown, an arrangement that served colonial diplomacy more than it reflected Cherokee practice. When Moytoy died in 1741, South Carolina officials regarded the position as heritable and recognized his son as successor. As Amouskositte was still a youth, he held little authority among the elders who led the Cherokee councils, and Great Tellico's standing depended heavily on its usefulness to the colony as a point of contact.

== "Emperor" of Tellico and decline ==
During the early 1750s, Great Tellico and the neighbouring town of Hiwassee sought to act as the Cherokee's principal channel to South Carolina. In 1752 Amouskositte, identified in colonial records as the "Young Emperor", travelled from Tellico to Williamsburg, Virginia to treat with that colony. The Tellico and Hiwassee leadership proved unable, however, to make the November 1751 treaty negotiated at Charlestown with Governor James Glen effective, or to persuade Glen to halt the Creek war against the Cherokee. This failure undermined the standing of the Tellico "emperorship". When Glen learned that Amouskositte had been negotiating separately with Virginia, he redirected South Carolina's dealings to Chota, whose leaders Connecorte (Old Hop) and Attakullakulla (the Little Carpenter) pressed their advantage in 1752 and 1753. By 1753 Chota had displaced Great Tellico as the dominant Overhill town, and Amouskositte's nominal emperorship had effectively come to an end.

Preceded by Moytoy of Tellico	First Beloved Man; 1741–1753	Succeeded by Kanagatucko (Old Hop)
