= Chota (Cherokee town) =

Historic place in Tennessee, US

- Chota and Tanasi Cherokee Village Sites
- U.S. National Register of Historic Places
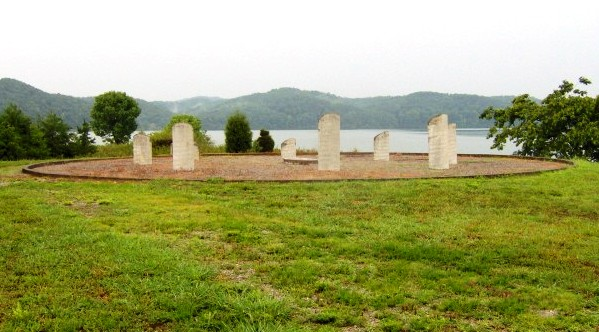
- Monument at the Chota site
- Location: Monroe County, Tennessee
- Nearest city: Vonore
- Coordinates: 35°33′18″N 84°7′52″W
- Built: c. 1600-1745 A.D.
- NRHP reference No.: 73001813
- Added to NRHP: 1973

Chota (also spelled Chote, Echota, Itsati, and other similar variations) is a historic Overhill Cherokee town site in Monroe County, Tennessee, in the southeastern United States. Developing after nearby Tanasi, Chota (Cherokee: ᎢᏣᏘ, romanized: Itsati) was the most important of the Overhill towns from the late 1740s until 1788. It replaced Tanasi as the de facto capital, or 'mother town' of the Cherokee people.

A number of prominent Cherokee leaders were born or resided at Chota, among them Attakullakulla, Oconostota, Old Hop, Old Tassel, Hanging Maw, and Nancy Ward.

The former Chota and Tanasi sites are listed together on the National Register of Historic Places; Tanasi also has an archaeological site designation (40MR62) assigned in 1972. Since 1979, both sites have been mostly submerged by the Tellico Lake impoundment of the Little Tennessee River. Archeological excavations were conducted before the dam was completed.

During the excavations, the site of the Chota townhouse was found. Major Cherokee towns were centered around a large townhouse or council house, the site of community meetings of hundreds of people. These were usually built on top of an existing platform mound in the center of the town. These earthworks had typically been built by ancestral peoples of the South Appalachian Mississippian or earlier cultures.

Prior to the flooding of Tellico Reservoir, the Chota townhouse site was raised above the reservoir's operating levels and connected via a causeway to the mainland. The Chota monument, situated directly above the ancient townhouse site, consists of eight pillars —one for each of the seven Cherokee clans, and one for the nation. The grave of Chief Oconostota, found in the 1969 excavations, was re-interred next to the monument. This site is now managed by the federally recognized Eastern Band of Cherokee Indians, based in Cherokee, North Carolina.

== Geography ==
The Little Tennessee River enters Tennessee from its source in the Appalachian Mountains and flows for just over 50 miles (80 km) through parts of Blount, Monroe, and Loudon counties before joining the Tennessee River near present-day Lenoir City. Tellico Lake, created by the completion of Tellico Dam in 1979, spans the lower 33 miles (53 km) of the river. The Chota site is located approximately 27 miles (43 km) above the mouth of the river, opposite a sharp bend in the river known as Bacon's Bend.

Both Chota and Tanasi were developed by the Cherokee on a relatively flat terrace along the river, flanked by steep hills rising to the south. These hills are part of the Appalachian Ridge-and-Valley Physiographic Province, which is characterized by narrow, elongated ridges and steep hills. The Great Smoky Mountains and the Unicoi Mountains, both part of the main Appalachian crest, rise a few miles to the southeast and southwest, respectively.

The Tanasi and Chota monuments are located just off Highway 360 (Citico Road) on Bacon Ferry Road, which ends in a cul-de-sac parking lot. A short, maintained trail connects the parking lot to the Chota monument.

== History ==
=== Rise of Chota ===
Tanasi is first mentioned in early 18th-century documents as the base or destination of various English colonial traders and diplomats. Tanasi appears on multiple maps of the Overhill territory produced in the 1720s and 1730s, but Chota does not. This suggests that Chota may have been part of Tanasi, or may not have been considered a town before the 1740s. In the 1720s, the head man of Tanasi— known simply as the "Tanasi Warrior"— was the chief of the Overhill towns in what is now Tennessee, and the Middle and Valley towns in Western North Carolina. Chota does not appear in historical records until around 1745.

In 1730, however, Moytoy of Tellico, with the help of English emissary Alexander Cuming, was crowned "Emperor of the Cherokee." This effectively shifted the overall capital to his town of Great Tellico, where Moytoy was chief. When Moytoy died in 1741, his son, Amouskositte, attempted to succeed him as emperor. But Conocotocko, called Old Hop by the English, was the head man at Chota and began to consolidate power. By 1753 Chota had usurped Great Tellico as the "mother town" of the Overhill Cherokee.

Around this time, on the eve of the French and Indian War, the Cherokee were reportedly leaning toward the French side, prompting the English colonies of Virginia and South Carolina to increase contact with leaders of the Overhill towns in order to strengthen an alliance. Virginia sent Major Andrew Lewis with 60 men to build a fort at Chota, which was completed in August 1756. It was never garrisoned because the Cherokee allied with the English against the French. Later that year, South Carolina sent engineer William de Brahm with 300 men to build Fort Loudoun, which was completed on the Little Tennessee River in March 1757.

By 1760, relations between the British and Cherokee had soured, erupting into open conflict by February. After Cherokee warriors laid siege to Fort Loudoun, a confrontation between 14 Cherokee hostages at Fort Prince George and the fort's garrison on February 16 resulted in the death of the hostages. After several months, the Fort Loudoun garrison surrendered. The Cherokee killed many of them as they struggled to return to Virginia, and took plunder from the fort to Chota.

=== Timberlake's visit, 1761-62 ===
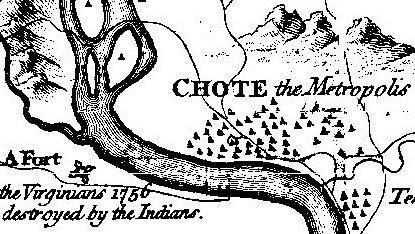
Detail of Chota from Timberlake's 1765 "Draught of the Cherokee Country"

After the fall of Fort Loudoun, British forces launched another offensive against the Cherokee, and the Overhill towns sued for peace. This was granted in the Treaty of Long Island in 1761. Virginia authorities dispatched a friendship delegation led by colonist and military officer Henry Timberlake to solidify peace with the Overhill towns. He reached Chota in late December 1761, accompanied by Ostenaco (the head Cherokee man at Tomotley). At a ceremony inside the Chota townhouse, Ostenaco ceremoniously buried a hatchet, symbolizing peace between the British and Cherokee, and the parties smoked ritual tobacco in peace pipes. Timberlake spent the night in Old Hop's "hot-house" (a circular dwelling used by the Overhill Cherokee in cooler months) before proceeding to Citico the next day.

Timberlake kept a journal, which was published posthumously as his memoirs. He also made a detailed map of the Cherokee towns along the river, entitled "Draught of the Cherokee Country". It recorded 52 dwellings and a townhouse at Chota. He listed chiefs, the number of warriors, and general population for each of the major towns. Conocotocko (Old Hop) was listed as governor of both Chota and Tanasi. The 175 warriors available at Chota made up the second-largest contingent among the Overhill towns, behind only Citico.

=== Decline ===
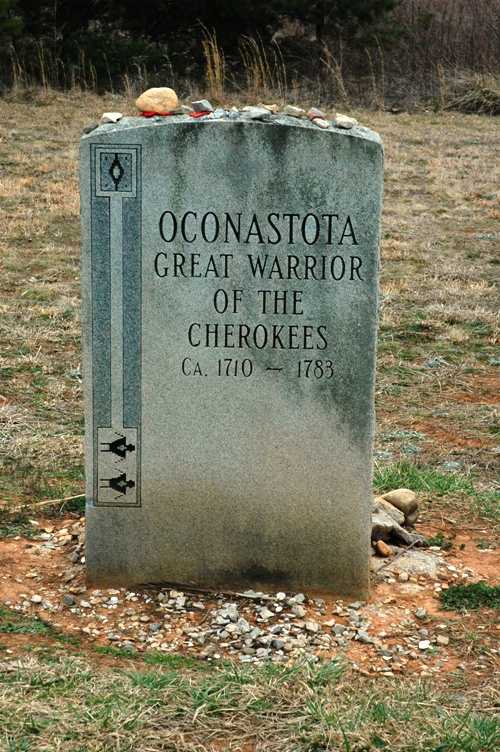
Oconostota's grave site at Chota

At the outbreak of the American Revolution, the Cherokee aligned with the British, hoping to expel American colonists from their territory. In 1776, Dragging Canoe (the head man at Mialoquo), Old Abraham of Chilhowee, and The Raven led an unsuccessful three-pronged attack against Heaton's station, Fort Watauga, and Carter's Valley, respectively. In response, Virginia sent Colonel William Christian to subdue the Overhill towns. Christian's force entered the Little Tennessee Valley unopposed and negotiated a truce with chiefs Attakullakulla (Dragging Canoe's father) and Oconastota. When Dragging Canoe refused to negotiate, however, Christian destroyed the towns of Great Tellico, Citico, Mialoquo, Chilhowee, and Toqua.

In 1780, John Sevier, who had just returned from the Battle of Kings Mountain, led an invasion of the Overhill country in response to several attacks by Cherokee on American settlements. His party destroyed most of the remaining Overhill towns, including their capital, Chota.

The Cherokee rebuilt Chota by 1784, but it never recovered its former status. In 1788, Old Tassel—who had become the leader of the Overhill towns—was murdered with another chief by Americans under a flag of truce at Chilhowee. Largely in response to this atrocity, the Chickamauga Cherokee moved their capital further south to Ustanali, near what developed as modern Calhoun, Georgia.

In the late 1790s, the Duke of Orleans paid a visit to the American fort known as Tellico Blockhouse while on a tour of East Tennessee. There the duke watched more than 600 Cherokees engage in a ritual "ballplay" at Chota; he bet six gallons of brandy on the outcome. By this time, only five dwellings remained standing in the town.

== Archaeology ==
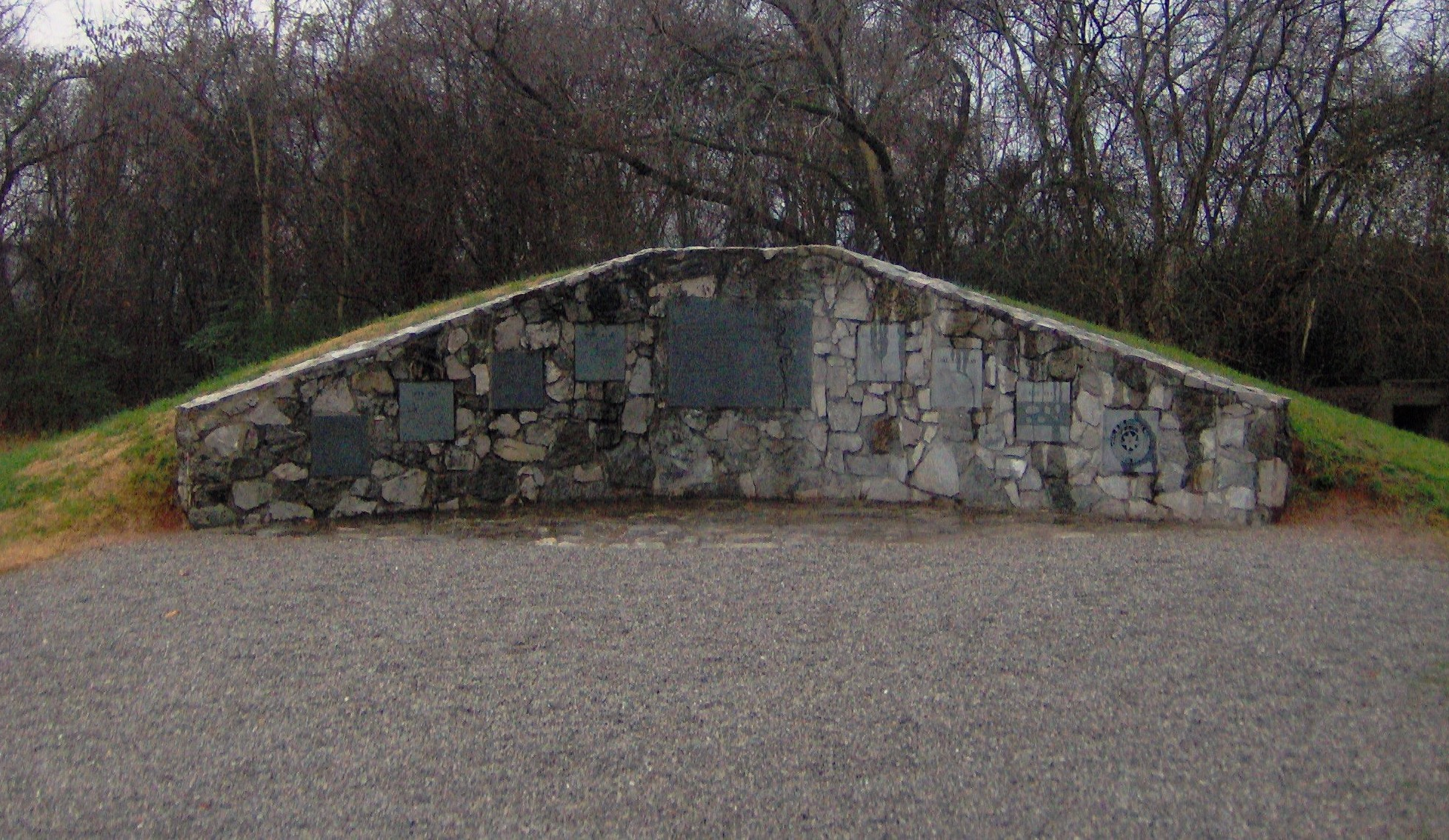
Burial mound at the Sequoyah Museum, where 191 burials uncovered in the Tellico Archaeological Project were reinterred

In the 1880s, Cyrus Thomas, working for the Smithsonian Institution, conducted a survey of ancient earthwork mounds in the Little Tennessee Valley. Thomas excavated a mound at the Chota site and uncovered several artifacts. The site was undisturbed for decades.

In 1939, a University of Tennessee team, mainly under the auspices of Thomas Lewis and Madeline Kneburg, conducted excavations at the Chota site. Laborers were paid by the Works Projects Administration during the Great Depression. Their findings, which Lewis and Kneburg hoped would provide comparison data for their Hiwassee Island findings, included 85 pit features, 12 burials, and one structure.

After the Tennessee Valley Authority announced plans in 1967 to build Tellico Dam, which would flood several historic Cherokee sites, the University of Tennessee initiated a plan to conduct salvage archeological excavations throughout the Little Tennessee Valley. Excavations were conducted at Chota between 1969 and 1974, as litigation stalled the dam project. The excavations uncovered 783 features (mostly refuse pits), the postmold layouts of 31 structures, and 91 burials. Burial 10, uncovered in 1969, was identified by its grave goods (namely a pair of wire spectacles) as that of Chief Oconostota. Thousands of stone and ceramic artifacts were uncovered, including projectile points dating to the Archaic period (8000–1000 B.C.).

The structures uncovered at Chota included two townhouses, one of which had a diameter of 60 feet (18 m) and another a diameter of just over 50 feet (15 m). The smaller townhouse, which was slightly older, may have been the Tanasi townhouse. Other structures included a 48-foot (15 m) x 23-foot (7.0 m) summer pavilion flanked by a 100-foot (30 m) x 160-foot (49 m) village plaza, and 11 rectangular summer dwelling/circular winter dwelling pairings. Dwellings were spaced between 40 feet (12 m) and 100 feet (30 m) apart and were located up to 2,000 feet (610 m) from the townhouse. One of the dwellings was classified as Early Mississippian culture (c. 1000–1300 A.D.), while the others were historic Cherokee.

In 1986, the burials revealed at the Chota site were reinterred in a burial mound at the Sequoyah Museum, near Vonore. The exception was the remains of Oconostota, which were buried next to the Chota monument over the townhouse site, as desired by the Cherokee.

== Chota monument ==
The eight pillars stand for the seven clans and one for the Cherokee nation as a whole.

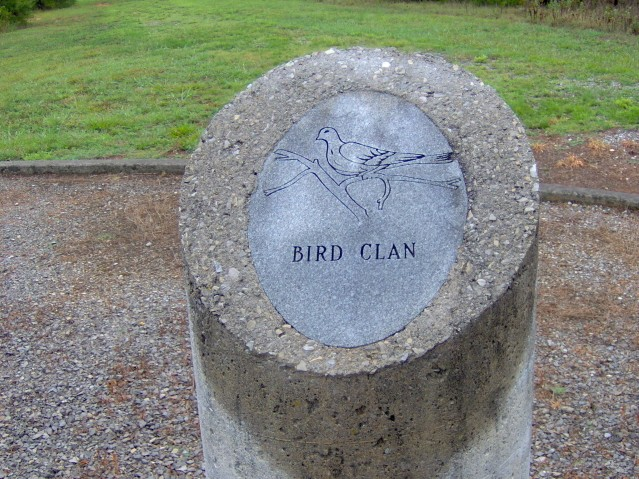
Bird Clan (Ani-tsiskwa)

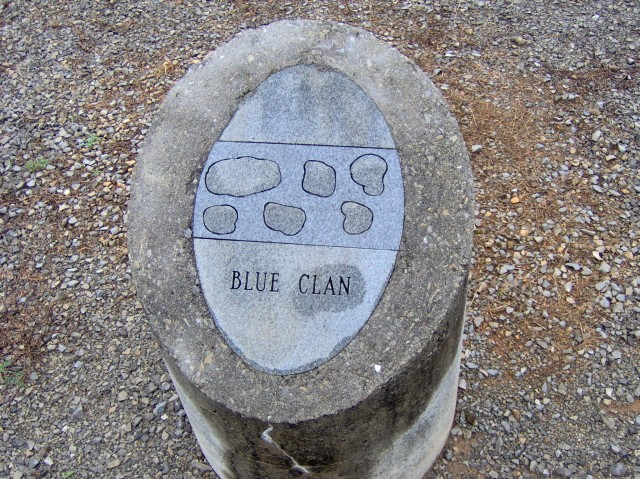
Blue Clan (Ani-sahoni)

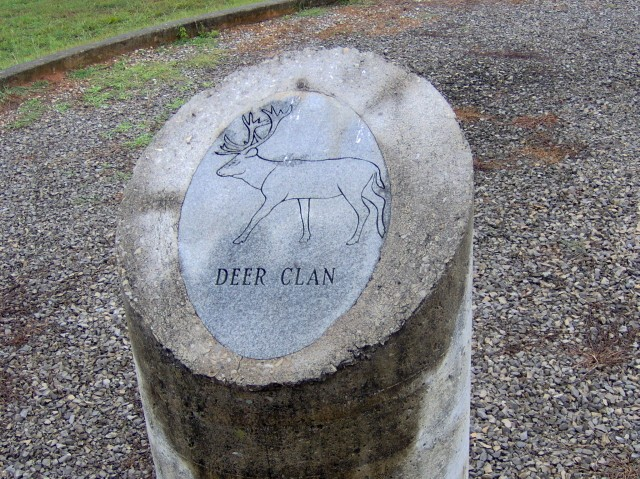
Deer Clan (Ani-kawi)

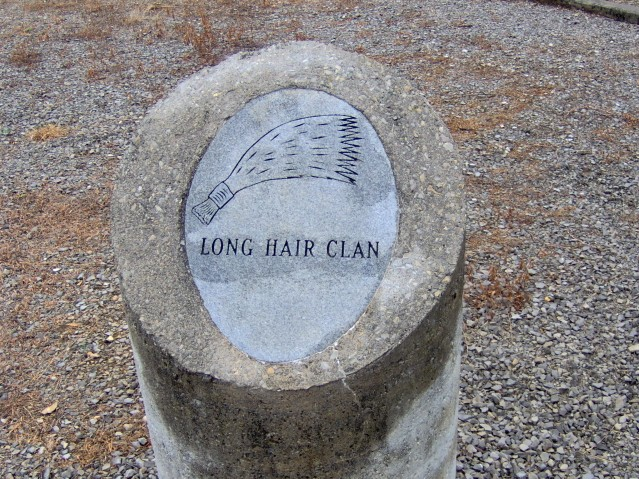
Long Hair Clan (Ani-gilohi)

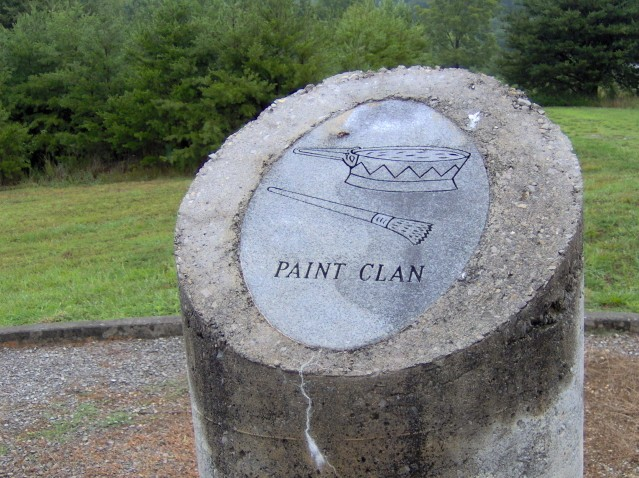
Paint Clan (Ani-wodi)

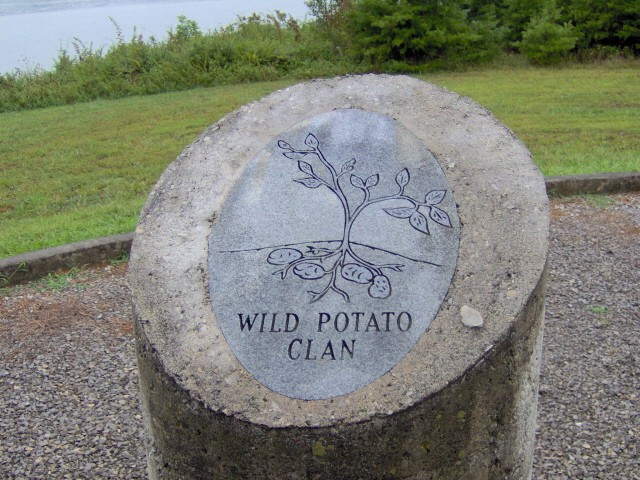
Wild Potato Clan (Ani-gatagewi)

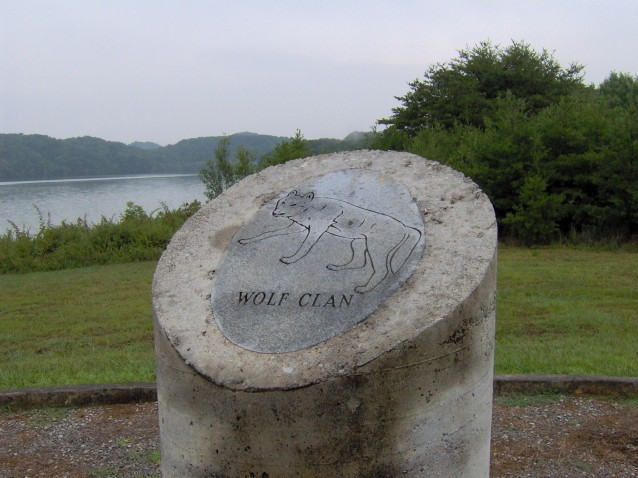
Wolf Clan (Ani-waya)

== See also ==
- New Echota
