= Oconostota =

Cherokee war chief (c. 1710–1783)

- In office 1775–1781
- Preceded by: Attakullakulla

First Beloved Man of Chota

Personal details
- Born: c. 1707 The over-mountain region, Carolina, British America
- Died: c. 1783 Chota, Tennessee, U.S.
- Spouse: Polly Carpenter (Do Yo Sti)
- Parent: Moytoy
- Known for: Skiagusta and First Beloved Man of Chota

Oconostota (Note: Also, Oconastota.) (c. 1707–1783) was a Cherokee skiagusta (war chief) of Chota, which was for nearly four decades the primary town in the Overhill territory, and within what is now Monroe County, Tennessee. He served as the First Beloved Man of Chota from 1775 to 1781.

== Name ==
Oconostota's Cherokee name, according to Mooney, was "Aganstata," which he translated as "groundhog-sausage" (agana: "groundhog"; tsistau: "I am pounding it" (Note: as in pounding meat in a mortar)). His name is written as "Oconastota" (with two 'a's) on his grave marker at the site that memorializes Chota. Chota had been one of the mother towns of the Overhill Cherokee, and from the late 1740s to 1788 was the chief town of the Cherokee people. It was located in the area of present-day southeastern Tennessee.

== Background ==
Oconostota was born around 1707. He grew up among the Overhill Cherokee settlements. Oconostota's first wife was Oo-Loo-Sta (Polly) Ani-Wa'Di of the Paint Clan. Her maiden name was Uka of Chota. Their daughter, Nionne Ollie, married his cousin Attakullakulla, his predecessor as First Beloved Man. Some sources claim Nionne Ollie was a Natchez refugee who was adopted as the daughter of Oconostota's wife (as the Cherokee were a matrilineal society, inheritance and descent went through the mother's clan.) (Note: Some Natchez, also known as Natchers in English spelling, lived in the Upper South prior to relocating farther south along the Mississippi River.)

Oconostota first appears in historical records in 1736. He was a prominent warrior among the Cherokee, and was called "The Great Warrior of Chota." He may have been influenced by the German utopian Christian Priber, who lived with the Cherokee from about 1735 to 1739. He transferred his allegiance from the French to the British, and in 1753 led a pro-British Cherokee force against the Choctaw during the French and Indian War. Over the next 12 years the Cherokee fought both with and against the British. But, as more European-American settlers encroached on Cherokee land, the Cherokee threw their support behind the British, who had issued a proclamation to exclude settlers from the Overhill territory.

The French after losing Fort Duquesne to the British attempted to influence the Cherokees to attack the Carolinian settlers. The impetus for war with the Carolinians began when a number of Cherokee had stolen a several horses and were headed to their homes when they were pursued and killed by English colonists. The Cherokees were enraged by this and massacred inhabitants of several settlements on the Carolina frontier. The garrison of Fort Loudon was attacked several times and Governor Littleton in response to the hostile acts invaded the Cherokee country.

The Cherokee sued for peace however the governor refused, and detained the chiefs prisoners, marching them to Fort Prince George. Governor Lyttleton saw the necessity for peace. Occonostota, was the principal promoter of a war, and since would take ever opportunity to ambush those outside the safety of the fort, killing fourteen. Occonostota dispatched a squaw to Captain Coytmore, inviting him to a conference on the river bank. The Captain and two lieutenants met with Occonostota, who during the meeting, signaled Cherokee hidden in the bushes, and the officers were fired upon killing the Captain and wounding the two others who made it back to the fort. The order was made to place the thirty-two hostages in irons but while executing their orders a Cherokee stabbed one with a knife. The soldiers exasperated, fell upon them and killed them all.

In February 1760 Oconostota led a retaliatory attack on Fort Prince George in South Carolina, where colonists had imprisoned 29 Cherokee chiefs seeking peace and then executed them. He defeated Col. Archibald Montgomery in Macon County in June 1760 at the Battle of Echoee, and later captured Fort Loudoun near the confluence of the Little Tennessee River and Tennessee River. The garrison received honorable terms from the Cherokees and upon their march homeward were attacked by the Indians and nearly all cut to pieces.

Many histories state that Oconostota went to England in either 1730 or 1762, but he was not a member of either delegation. Even during years of tension, Oconostota worked to have diplomatic relations with the colonists. In an unusual honor, John Stuart, Superintendent of Indian Affairs in the Carolinas, sponsored Oconostota for membership in the exclusive St. Andrews Society of Charlestown, South Carolina, for which the headman was approved and received a certificate in 1773.

Oconostota became the First Beloved Man of the Cherokee following the death of his cousin Attakullakulla, sometime around 1775–1777. His tenure was fraught with warfare and struggle, as the American Revolutionary War broke out. In 1780 both the towns of Chota and Tanasi were destroyed by American revolutionary forces during their rebellion against the British and their allies.

Oconostota was believed to have died in either 1782 or 1783. He was buried with his hands on his chest holding a broadsword pointing down his body.

== Memorial ==
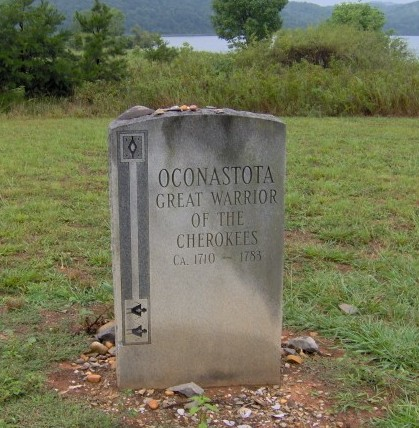
Oconostota's grave at the Chota memorial, in Monroe County, Tennessee

During the late 20th-century excavations at the site of Chota, prior to the Tellico Reservoir impoundment, the remains of Oconostota were found. They were identified by a pair of his reading glasses that had been buried with him.

To memorialize this significant town site, the TVA raised land above the flood level of the reservoir, and over the grave site and former site of the Chota council house. Oconostota's remains were reinterred here in the 1970s and marked by a gravestone. It has become a tradition to place a pebble on his gravestone to symbolize the permanence of his memory and legacy, since a stone can never die. In addition, a memorial to the seven Cherokee clans and the nation overall was installed at this site (see photo above).

== Bibliography ==
- Litton, Gaston L. "The Principal Chiefs of the Cherokee Nation", Chronicles of Oklahoma 15:3 (September 1937) 253–270. (accessed August 28, 2006).
- Mooney, James. Myths of the Cherokee, (1900, reprint 1995).
- Kelly, James C. "Oconostota", Journal of Cherokee Studies 3:4 (Fall 1978), 221–238.
