= Moytoy of Citico =

Cherokee leader

Moytoy of Citico was said to be a Cherokee leader or war chief living in Virginia during the time of the Anglo-Cherokee War (1759–1761), but there is little evidence that he existed or that this name is correct.

== Earliest References ==
The earliest source for him appears to be in books by John P. Brown written in the mid-1900s, almost 200 years after he was said to have lived. These books either provide very little information on his sources, or use sources that are difficult to locate and confirm such as personal testimonies from European-Americans outside of the tribe. This leader does not seem to be referenced in earlier history books or journals on the Cherokee that were written closer to the time he would have lived. While some modern sources have stated that he was the nephew of Moytoy of Tellico, there seems to be no historical evidence of this relationship.

== Military actions ==
James P. Brown wrote that in retaliation for perceived slights by the British while campaigning with them against the French in the French and Indian War in 1758, Moytoy took his band and left the campaign to return home. He stole a number of British horses in compensation. The rest of the Cherokee allies were said to agree with his perception of the British, but the leaders Attakullakulla and Ostenaco did not agree with his actions.

== Etymology ==
See Moytoy of Tellico for more information on the origins of the name "Moytoy."
