= Conocotocko I =

18th-century Overhill Cherokee leader (died 1760)

Conocotocko
- ᎬᎾᎦᏙᎦ
- Died: 1760; Chota, in present-day Tennessee
- Other names: Old Hop, Connecorte, the Fire King
- Occupation: First Beloved Man of the Cherokee
- Known for: Leading the Overhill Cherokee from Chota in the years before the Anglo-Cherokee War
- Term: c. 1753 – 1760
- Predecessor: Amouskositte
- Successor: Conocotocko II ("Standing Turkey")
- Relatives: Attakullakulla (reported nephew), Conocotocko II (nephew)

Conocotocko (Cherokee: ᎬᎾᎦᏙᎦ, romanized: Gvnagadoga, lit. 'Standing Turkey'), known to British colonists as Old Hop and also recorded as Connecorte, was an Overhill Cherokee leader who served as the First Beloved Man (Uku) of Chota, and so of the Cherokee nation, from about 1753 until his death in 1760.

By the early 1750s, Conocotocko had made Chota the leading town of the Overhill Cherokee, displacing the British-recognized "Emperorship" based at Great Tellico. As First Beloved Man he was the senior civil authority among the Overhills during the contest for Cherokee favor among South Carolina, the Colony of Virginia, and the French in the years before the French and Indian War and the Anglo-Cherokee War. Much of his diplomacy was conducted through his close associate Attakullakulla, the Little Carpenter, and in 1755 the two men agreed at the conference of Saluda to acknowledge British sovereignty over Cherokee lands, a decision that drew lasting criticism from Cherokee traditionalists.

== Name ==
Conocotocko's Cherokee name, ᎬᎾᎦᏙᎦ (Gvnagadoga), translates as "Standing Turkey". British traders instead called him "Old Hop" because of a physical disability that left him lame, said to have resulted from a childhood accident. Some accounts also refer to him as the "Fire King".

Because his nephew and eventual successor carried the same Cherokee name, Conocotocko II is usually identified in English-language sources by the literal translation "Standing Turkey", or by the folk-etymologized form "Cunne Shote", while the elder leader is identified as "Old Hop". The name appears in colonial records in a great many spellings, among them Canackte, Caneecatee, Connecorte, Kanagatucko, Kanagatoga, and Guhna-gadoga. Conley writes that it "has suffered perhaps the worst indignities of any Cherokee name of this period".

== Rise to leadership at Chota ==
Before 1751, South Carolina conducted its official dealings with the Cherokee through the so-called "Emperor" at Great Tellico, an office that the Scottish adventurer Alexander Cuming had improvised during his 1730 visit and that colonial authorities found useful for influencing the nation. Conocotocko, who was little known to the English, appears to have become the head man of Chota, regarded by the Cherokee themselves as their principal town, sometime before 1740. As First Beloved Man he was expected to defer to the town council, to serve as an impartial arbiter of disputes, and to uphold customary practice rather than to rule by personal command, and he often left others, above all Attakullakulla, to speak on his behalf. A reference work of the Tennessee Historical Society likewise records that Attakullakulla returned to the Overhill country about 1750 and soon became second in authority to Old Hop, the Uku at Chota, who was probably his uncle.

Through the 1740s, Chota under Conocotocko and Attakullakulla worked to pull the Cherokee out of their wars with the Indian nations to the north and opened dealings with the French. Contact with the French ran in part through an agent the English called "French John", reportedly a captive taken in a Cherokee raid who had then been adopted into Conocotocko's household. According to the historian David H. Corkran, the two leaders did not mean to break with the British, but rather to build a bargaining position between the rival European powers.

South Carolina then placed an embargo on the Cherokee trade, a step that weakened the Cherokee in their ongoing war with the Creek. Chota answered by gathering defeated refugees from the Lower Towns and by working to undercut Great Tellico. Conocotocko sent word to the French at Fort Toulouse and dispatched Attakullakulla to Virginia. The Tellico "Emperorship" proved unable to honor its agreements with Governor James Glen, and by 1753 Chota had overtaken Great Tellico as the leading Overhill town, with Conocotocko established as the dominant figure in the region.

The anthropologist Fred Gearing described Old Hop as calm and patient, skilled at drawing rival Cherokee factions back together, and reluctant to impose decisions of his own, qualities that Gearing saw as the Cherokee ideal of circumspect leadership.

== Diplomacy with the British and French ==
In April 1752, Chota sent a conciliatory message to Glen, proposing that South Carolina deal directly with Chota and arguing that the trade embargo broke the treaty of 1730. When Glen learned that the Tellico "Emperor" had himself been negotiating with Virginia, he turned toward Chota. In June 1753, Attakullakulla used the prospect of Cherokee approaches to the French and to Virginia to press Glen into a peace with the Creek and into trade concessions. Recognizing how much power Chota now held, Glen resolved to build a fort near Keowee in the Lower Towns, the future Fort Prince George, as a counterweight to Chota's influence.

Rival headmen, perhaps encouraged by Carolina traders, then put pressure on the two leaders. They accused Conocotocko of accepting British presents under false pretenses and charged Attakullakulla with breaking the word he had given in England in 1730. Conocotocko was distressed enough that he threatened to step down, and reportedly even to take his own life, before relatives talked him out of it. Attakullakulla, who had been badly beaten, afterward aligned himself closely with South Carolina.

In 1755, Attakullakulla persuaded Conocotocko to meet Glen at the conference of Saluda. There, in return for favorable trade terms and Glen's promise to build a fort in the Overhill country, the two leaders acknowledged British sovereignty over Cherokee territory. The concession put both men out of favor with Cherokee traditionalists, although they expected the benefits of the treaty to outweigh the opposition. Glen then failed to make good on his promises, which left Conocotocko in a difficult position. Even so, he turned down a Shawnee invitation to join the French against the British.

To gain leverage, Conocotocko and his councilors played Virginia off against South Carolina, sending warriors to help defend the Virginia frontier while pressing Charleston for action. At the Treaty of Broad River in March 1756, Virginia commissioners promised a fort and a trade at Chota in return for additional Cherokee warriors. Virginia, like South Carolina, was slow to act, and Conocotocko again opened correspondence with the French. Late in 1756, Glen's successor, William Henry Lyttelton, finally secured the construction of Fort Loudoun near Chota. The fort, named for the Earl of Loudoun, was built in 1756 and 1757 on the lower Little Tennessee River. Around the same time, Conocotocko helped "French John" slip out of the Cherokee country.

== Decline and death ==
In 1759, after Virginia frontiersmen killed Cherokee warriors returning from service against the French, opinion among the Cherokee turned sharply toward war with the British. Conocotocko sided with the war faction and, according to Corkran, took part in a plan to have the peace-minded Attakullakulla killed. Learning of the plot, Attakullakulla moved to depose Conocotocko and declared himself head of the nation, but the traditionalists would not follow him, and Conocotocko remained First Beloved Man. He died in 1760, before the Anglo-Cherokee War fully reached the Overhill towns.

== See also ==
- Transylvania (colony)
- Attakullakulla

| Preceded by Amouskositte | First Beloved Man; 1753–1760 | Succeeded by Standing Turkey |
