= Great Tellico =

Cherokee town at the site of present-day Tellico Plains, Tennessee,

Coordinates: 35°23′N 84°17′W

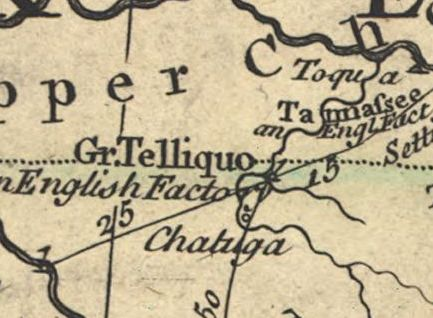
Great Tellico, as shown on John Mitchell's 1755 map of North America

Great Tellico was a Cherokee town at the site of present-day Tellico Plains, Tennessee, where the Tellico River emerges from the Appalachian Mountains. Great Tellico was one of the largest Cherokee towns in the region, and had a sister town nearby named Chatuga (Syllabary: ᏣᏚᎩ). Its name in Cherokee is more properly written Talikwa (Syllabary: ᏓᎵᏆ), but more commonly known as Diligwa. It is sometimes spelled Telliquo, Telliquah or, in Oklahoma, Tahlequah. There were several Cherokee settlements named Tellico, the largest of which is distinguished from the others by calling it "Great". The meaning of the word "Talikwa" is thought to be lost by the Cherokees. However, in an article authored by reporter Tesina Jackson of the Cherokee Phoenix the meaning of the word is stated as "the open place where the grass grows".

The Warrior Path— a branch of the Great Indian Warpath— passed through Great Tellico, linking it to Chota in the north and Great Hiwassee in the south, via Conasauga Creek. In addition, the Wachesa Trail (aka. "The Trading Path", later called the Unicoi Turnpike), ran from Great Tellico southeast over the Unicoi Range of the Appalachian Mountains, linking the Overhill Cherokee to the Middle and Lower Cherokee towns in Georgia, North Carolina, and South Carolina. The Trading Path became the main route of trade between the British and the Cherokee during the 18th century (Duncan 2003:245).

In the early 18th century, Great Tellico was the de facto capital of the Overhill Cherokee. Several prominent Cherokee leaders came from the town, such as Moytoy of Tellico. After his death in 1741, Great Tellico began to fade. By the 1750s, Chota was largely recognized as the principal town of the Overhill Cherokee.
