= Attakullakulla =

Cherokee First Beloved Man

- ᎠᏔᎫᎧᎷ
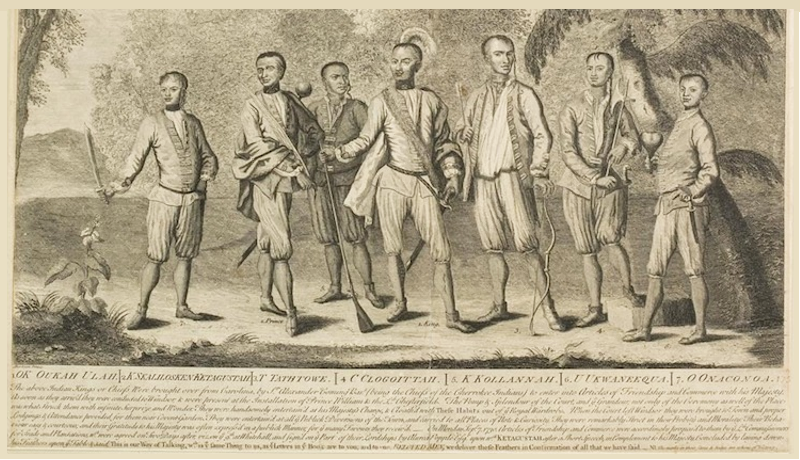
- The seven Cherokee, including Attakullakulla, who traveled with Sir Alexander Cuming back to London, England in 1730
- In office 1761–c. 1775
- Preceded by: Standing Turkey
- Succeeded by: Oconostota

First Beloved Man

Personal details
- Born: Onkanacleah ("leaning wood") c. 1715 Overhill Cherokee settlements, North Carolina, British America
- Died: c. 1777 North Carolina, U.S.
- Nickname: Little Carpenter

Attakullakulla (Cherokee: ᎠᏔᎫᎧᎷ, romanized: Atagukalu) (Note: also spelled Attacullaculla) and often called Little Carpenter by the English) (c. 1715 – c. 1777) was an influential Cherokee leader and the tribe's First Beloved Man, serving from 1761 to around 1775. His son was Dragging Canoe, the first leader of the Chickamauga faction of the Cherokee tribes.

While Attakullakulla was "a man of remarkably small stature, he was noted for his maturity, wisdom, and graciousness." Attakullakulla knew some English but was not fluent. He was, however, considered the most gifted Cherokee orator from the 1760s to the 1770s. He first appeared in historic records in 1730, noted as accompanying Alexander Cuming, a British treaty commissioner, and six other Cherokee to England. He was one of the signatories of an early Cherokee treaty with Great Britain.

By the early 1750s, Attakullakulla, renowned for his oratorical skills, had been appointed a principal speaker for the Cherokee tribes. In the 1750s and 1760s Attakullakulla dominated Cherokee diplomacy. Although he usually favored the British, he was a consummate diplomat, always hoping for a peaceful resolution to problems but looking out for the best interests of the Cherokee.

== Names ==
Early in his life, he was first known as Onkanacleah. According to anthropologist James Mooney, Attakullakulla's Cherokee name could be translated as "leaning wood", from ada meaning "wood", and gulkalu, a verb that implies something long, leaning against some other object. His name "Little Carpenter" was related both to the English meaning of his Cherokee name and a reference to his physical stature. Naturalist William Bartram described the chief as "a man of remarkable small stature, slender, and delicate frame." "...his ears were cut and banded with silver, hanging nearly down to his shoulders. He was mild-mannered, brilliant, and witty..."

Contemporary Felix Walker also described Attakullakulla by the following: just "as a white carpenter could make every notch and joint fit in wood, so he could bring all his views to fill and fit their places in the political machinery of his nation". He was known to excel at building houses.

== Early life ==
Attakullakulla is believed to have been born in the territory of the Overhill Cherokee, in what is now East Tennessee, sometime in the early 1700s, although it is not known exactly when. His son, Turtle-at-Home, said that he was born to a sub-tribe of the Algonquian-speaking Nipissing in the North near Lake Superior. He was captured as an infant during a raid in which his parents were killed, and brought south to Overhill territory, where he was adopted by a Cherokee family, and raised as Cherokee. Attakullakulla believed he was of Jewish descent. He married Nionne Ollie, the daughter of his cousin, Oconostota. She was said to have been a Black, French speaking Natchez captive adopted by his cousin's wife. The marriage was permissible because the individuals were from different clans; he was Wolf Clan and she was Paint Clan.

In 1730, Attakullakulla was a member of a delegation of Cherokee leaders who traveled to England. In 1736, he rejected the advances of the French, who had sent emissaries to the Overhill tribes. Three or four years later, he was captured by the Ottawa, who were allies of the French. They held him captive in Quebec until 1748. Upon his return, he became one of the Cherokees' leading diplomats and an adviser to the Beloved Man of Chota, which had become the primary town of the Overhill settlements.

== Cherokee warrior ==
In the 1750s, Attakullakulla worked to provide a steady supply of trade goods for his people. When the French and Indian War began in North America, Cherokee warriors traveled to the Pennsylvania frontier to serve in British military campaigns against French and their Native American allies' strongholds.

Virginia frontiersmen killed some Cherokee on their way home after these campaigns. Attakullakulla journeyed to Pennsylvania, to Williamsburg, and then to Charles Town, securing the promise of British trade goods as compensation for participation in fighting. But this was not enough to satisfy young Cherokee who wished to honor their cultural obligation of "blood revenge" and sought social status. Throughout 1758 and 1759, Cherokee warriors launched retributive raids on the southern colonial frontier. Hoping that matters might be forgiven, Attakullakulla led a Cherokee war party against the French Fort Massiac, and tried to negotiate peace with the British.

These efforts proved unsuccessful. In late 1759, some Cherokee leaders went to Charleston to try to negotiate with South Carolina authorities for peace. The colonial governor, William Henry Lyttelton, seized the delegates as hostages until the Cherokee surrendered those men responsible for killing white settlers. Having raised an expeditionary force of 1,700 men, Lyttelton set out for Fort Prince George, with the hostages in tow, and arrived on December 9, 1759. Attakullakulla was forced to sign a treaty agreeing that the Cherokee would deliver suspected "murderers" in exchange for the nearly two dozen hostages confined at Fort Prince George.

Attakullakulla returned to Fort Prince George in early 1760 to negotiate for the release of the hostages, but to no avail. As peaceful negotiations failed, Oconostota lured Lt. Richard Coytmore out of the fort by waving a bridle over his head. He incited Cherokee warriors hiding in the woods to shoot and kill Coytmore. The garrison in the fort retaliated and executed all the remaining Cherokee hostages.

In response, the Cherokee launched an offensive against settlements on the southern frontier. Many Cherokee blamed Attakullakulla for the murders of the hostages. While he worked to try to bring about peace, later in 1760, British and South Carolina troops invaded the Cherokee Lower Towns and Middle Towns. They were forced to retreat, and the Overhill Cherokee besieged Fort Loudoun, gaining its surrender in August 1760. The Cherokee killed many of the garrison as they retreated to the East.

Attakullakulla again attempted to negotiate a peace, but this was not achieved until 1761, when the British and South Carolina military conducted a punitive expedition against the Middle and Lower Towns. Attakullakulla signed peace terms in Charles Town on December 18, 1761. He was robbed and harassed by angry frontiersmen on his journey home. Throughout the 1760s, he would work in vain to stall white settlement in the western Carolinas and Overhill Territory, and was a frequent guest of colonial officials in Charles Town and Williamsburg.

== Diplomatic contributions ==
In the 1750–1760s, Attakullakulla dominated Cherokee diplomacy. Although he usually favored the British, he was a skilled diplomat, always looking for a peaceful resolution to problems but looking out for the best interests of the Cherokee. After Connecorte died, Attakullakulla, the diplomat and peace chief, and Oconostota, the war chief, shared power at Chota; they led the Cherokee for a generation.

In the Treaty of Broad River (1756), Attakullakulla agreed to a Cherokee land cession to the English, in exchange for their promise to build forts in Cherokee territory to protect their women and children while the men were fighting with the British in the French and Indian War. He honored treaty promises to the English but was opposed by fellow Cherokee for doing so. He also played the colonies of South Carolina and Virginia against each other in order to secure fair trading practices for his people.

The Treaty of Peace and Friendship, signed by William Henry Lyttelton, 1st Baron Lyttelton, Governor of South Carolina, and Attakullakulla, stated that there would "be firm peace and friendship between all His Majesty's subjects of this province and the nation of Indians called the Cherokees, and then said Cherokees shall preserve peace with all his majesty's subjects whatsoever".

On June 2, 1760, he left the fort and was expelled from the Cherokee Council. He moved into the woods, finding it impolitic to be among either the ones who lost or the victors of the 1760 Cherokee War. In June 1761 a British expedition dispatched by General Jeffery Amherst and commanded by Colonel James Grant destroyed several Cherokee Lower and Middle towns in the Carolinas. The Cherokee recalled Attakullakulla to the council to negotiate peace with the British. Attakullakulla also influenced the selection of John Stuart as Superintendent of Southern Indian Affairs.

In 1772 Attakullakulla leased lands to the Watauga Association, an organization formed by Anglo-American settlers who wanted to create an independent community in what is now the upper eastern corner of Tennessee. In 1775 he favored the so-called Transylvania Purchase, by which North Carolina colonel Richard Henderson bought twenty million acres in present-day Kentucky and Middle Tennessee from the Cherokee. In May 1775, Attakullakulla, Oconostota and other elderly chiefs relinquished the sovereignty of the Cherokee Nation (now roughly the states of Kentucky and Tennessee) for £10,000.

== Family and death ==
Connecotre (Old Hop), the headman of the Cherokee during the 1750s, was his maternal uncle. Attakullakulla's son Dragging Canoe led a resistance to the United States in the 1780s. His niece, Nancy Ward, was a 'beloved woman', who had the power to free war captives.

During the Revolutionary War, Attakullakulla was one of a party of elder Cherokee leaders who ceded lands to Virginia, contrary to the wishes of younger warriors. Attakullakulla's son, Dragging Canoe, the Chickamauga Cherokee leader during the Cherokee-American wars, split with his father during this time.

After the Cherokee massacred much of the garrison from Fort Loudon, Attakullakulla realized that Capt. John Stuart, Superintendent of Indian Affairs under the colonial government, had escaped death. In order to save Stuart, Attakullakulla purchased him from the Cherokee who had taken him. Attakullakulla gave his rifle, clothes and all he could command to purchase Stuart. After this act, by Cherokee custom, Stuart was to be considered his eldest brother. Their lifelong friendship proved to be profitable to the English. The life of Capt. Stuart being again menaced, for refusing to aid in the mediated reduction of Fort George, Attakullakulla resolved to rescue his friend or die trying. He told his fellow Cherokee that he intended to go hunting and take his prisoner with him to eat venison. The distance to the frontier settlements was great. The expedition was necessary to prevent being overtaken by those in pursuit of the Cherokee. Nine days and nights they traveled through the wilderness until they fell in with a party of rangers sent out for protection of the frontier, who conducted them in safety to the settlements. Attakullakulla had a daughter named Rebecca "Nikiti" Carpenter with his first wife Nionne Ollie and another known as "Weena" with one of the survivors of the Loudon battle.

Attakullakulla is believed to have died between 1777 and 1780 in North Carolina, in territory that would later become Tennessee. He was succeeded as First Beloved Man of Chota by Oconostota.

== Bibliography ==
- Adair, James (1775). History of the American Indians. p. 148.
- Anderson, William; Rambo, Robert K. (2009). "Attakullakulla (Little Carpenter)". In Finkelman, Paul; Garrison, Tim Alan (eds.). Encyclopedia of United States Indian Policy and Law. Vol. 1. Washington, D.C.: CQ Press. pp. 108–109. ISBN 978-1933116983.
- The American Monthly Magazine and Critical Review (1817-1819). Vol. 4. New York. December 1818. p. 157. ASIN B00A0FDA2A.
- Bartram, William (1791). Travels through North and South Carolina, Georgia, east and west Florida, the Cherokee country, the extensive territories of the Muscogulges or Creek Confederacy, and the country of the Chactaws. Philadelphia: James & Johnson. hdl:loc.rbc/General.02676.1. LCCN rc01002676.
- Calloway, Colin G. The American Revolution in Indian Country: Crisis and Diversity in Native American Communities. Cambridge, UK: Cambridge University Press, 1995.
- Gerald Schroedl, "Attakullakulla," Tennessee Encyclopedia of History and Culture.
- Henry Thompson Malone, Cherokees of the Old South: A People in Transition, 1956.
- Izumi Ishii, "Attakullakulla", Oxford Dictionary of National Biography, 2004.
- James C. Kelly, American National Biography, 1999.
- Kelly, James C. "Notable Persons in Cherokee History: Attakullakulla." Journal of Cherokee Studies 3:1 (Winter 1978), 2–34.
- Kimber, Isaac (ed.); Kimber, Edward (ed.). "London magazine, or, Gentleman's monthly intelligencer, 1747–1783; London Vol. 29", (Mar 1760): 144–145.
- Kimber, Isaac (ed.); Kimber, Edward (ed.). London magazine, or, Gentleman's monthly intelligencer, 1747–1783; London Vol. 35, (Feb 1766): p. 87.
- Klink, Karl, and James Talman, ed. The Journal of Major John Norton. Toronto: Champlain Society, 1970.
- Litton, Gaston L. "The Principal Chiefs of the Cherokee Nation", Chronicles of Oklahoma 15:3 (September 1937), pp. 253–270 (retrieved August 18, 2006).
- Mooney, James. Myths of the Cherokee (1900, reprint 1992).
- Oliphant, John. Peace and War on the Anglo-Cherokee Frontier, 1756–63. Baton Rouge: Louisiana State University Press, 2001.
- Spencer C. Tucker, James R. Arnold, and Roberta Wiener. The Encyclopedia of North American Indian Wars, 1607–1890: A Political, Social, and Military History, 2011.
- Tortora, Daniel J. Carolina in Crisis: Cherokees, Colonists, and Slaves in the American Southeast, 1756–1763. Chapel Hill: University of North Carolina Press, 2015. ISBN 1-469-62122-3
- Walker, Felix. "Narrative of a Kentucky Adventure in 1775". Edited by Samuel R. Walker. DeBow's Review 16 (February 1854), pp. 150–55.
- Wright, Ronald. Stolen Continents (2005) p. 200.

Preceded by Standing Turkey	First Beloved Man; 1761–1775	Succeeded by Oconostota
