= Siege of Fort Loudoun =

1760 conflict in Tennessee

- Part of the Anglo-Cherokee War and the French and Indian War
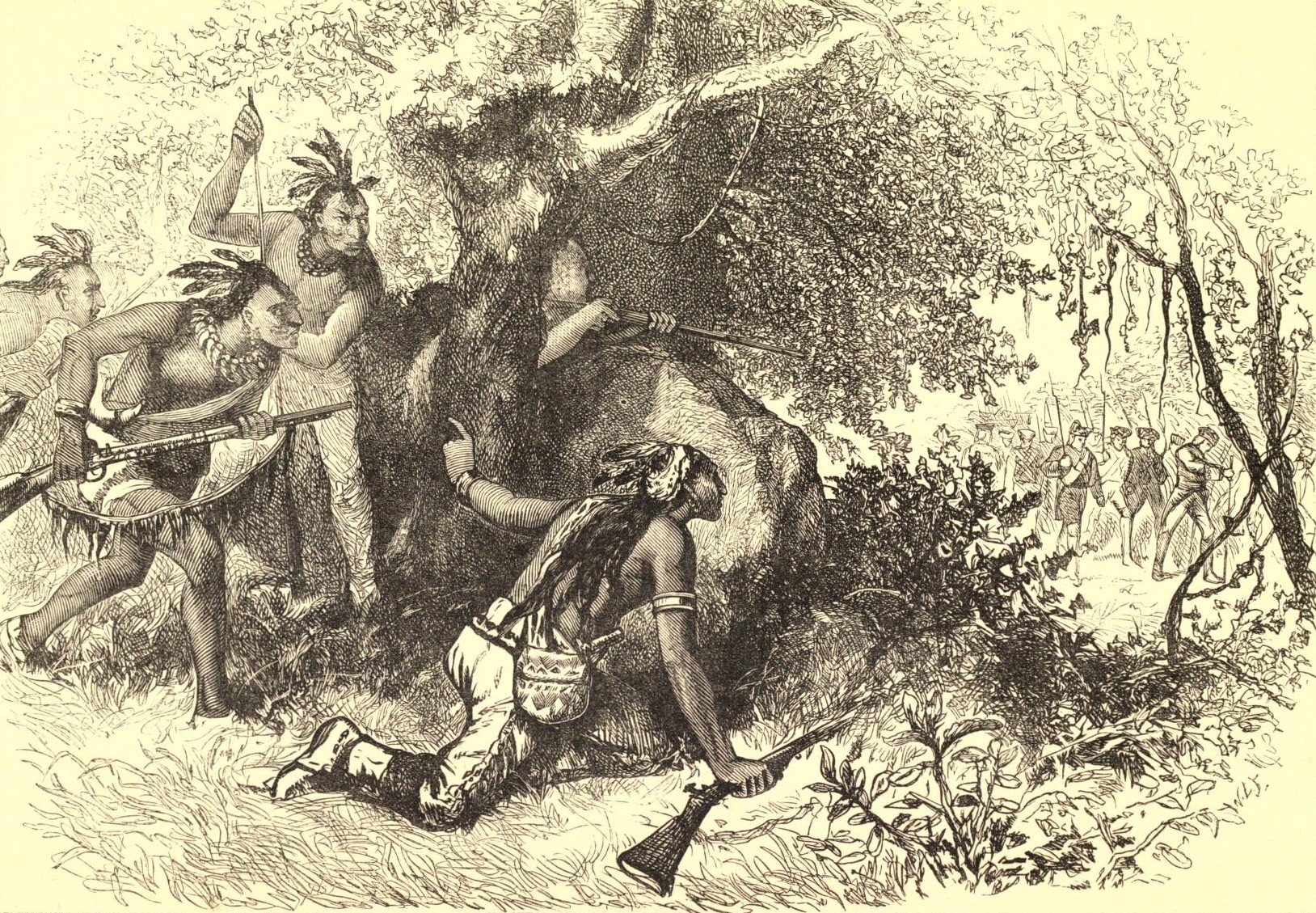
- Treachery of the Cherokees (illustration by W. J. T. depicting the massacre of surrounded troops, c. 1874)
Date	February 1760 to August 9, 1760
Location	Little Tennessee River; Cherokee Country now Tennessee
Result	Cherokee victory

Belligerents
Cherokee	Great Britain

Commanders and leaders
Ostenaco	Captain Paul Demeré (POW)

Strength
500–700	150–230; 12 cannons

Casualties and losses
Unknown	142; 22 killed; 120 captured

The siege of Fort Loudoun was an engagement during the Anglo-Cherokee War fought from February 1760 to August 1760 between the warriors of the Cherokee led by Ostenaco and the garrison of Fort Loudoun (in what is now Tennessee) composed of British and colonial soldiers commanded by Captain Paul Demeré.

During the French and Indian War the Cherokee were sought after as allies by the British and Provincial Colonial Governments to help contest the frontiers against the French and their Indian allies. An alliance was formed and both sides initially fulfilled each other's expectations. The Cherokee provided warriors and in return the British and Provincials provided supplies and protection of the warriors homelands. However, the alliance unravelled and soon incidents by both sides provoked the Anglo-Cherokee War in 1758.

== Background ==
The British had reports that indicated the French were planning to build forts in Cherokee territory (as they had already done with Ft. Charleville at Great Salt Lick on the Cumberland River); Ft. Toulouse, near present-day Montgomery, Alabama; Ft. Rosalie at Natchez, Mississippi; Ft. St. Pierre at modern day Yazoo, Mississippi; and Ft. Tombeckbe on the Tombigbee River). With the Cherokee now their allies, the British hastened to build forts of their own in the Cherokee lands, completing Fort Prince George near Keowee in South Carolina among the Cherokee Lower Towns; and Fort Loudoun in the Overhill towns. Once the forts were built, the Cherokee raised 400 warriors to fight in western Virginia Colony under Ostenaco. Oconostota and Attakullakulla led another large group to attack Fort Toulouse.

Fort Loudoun was built as an outpost of the British and their colony of South Carolina during the French and Indian War as part of an alliance treaty with the Cherokee in return for a field force of Cherokee warriors to help in the campaign against the French at Fort Duquesne. The Virginians in particular were desperate for Cherokee assistance against the French and their Shawnee Indian allies. The fort was to be both a trading post supplying manufactured goods, guns and powder to the Cherokee as well as providing additional defense of the Cherokee Middle Towns as well as a refuge for Cherokee women and children while their warriors were away on campaign.

Building of the fort began by 120 troops of Sergeant William Gibbs' South Carolina Provincial Militia accompanied by 80 British regulars and was continued by Captain Postell's Company of construction into 1757. It was named after General John Campbell, 4th Earl of Loudoun, the British Commander in Chief in North America. It was sited on the south side of the Little Tennessee River on high ground about five miles below the Cherokee capitol town of Chota. The elongated diamond-shaped fort was designed by a German engineer, William Gerald de Brahm, who departed before completion on Christmas Day 1756. The earthen walls topped with wooden palisades 15 feet high and 100 feet long on each side and the 4 corners were 2 large and 2 small bastions each mounting 3 small cannon or swivel guns. The moat was some 50 feet wide and there was a ravelin covering the front gate. When completed, operational and garrisoned by 90 regulars and 120 provincial troops in the summer of 1757 the troops families moved to the fort and a small community was started.

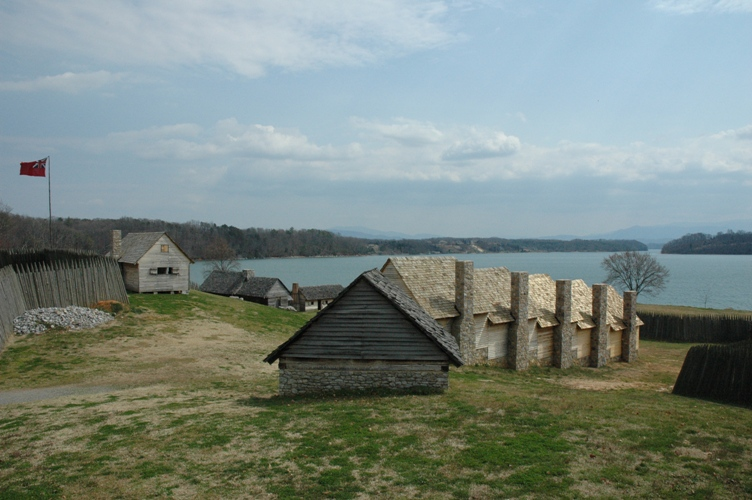
The view of reconstructed fort interior from Bastion King George to the barracks.

The fort remained dependent on white settlements nearly 200 miles east over the Appalachian Mountains for much of their supplies. Fort Loudoun's first commander was Captain Raymond Demeré who was friendly with the Cherokee, he was replaced by his brother, Paul Demeré whose overbearing nature exacerbated bad relations with the Cherokee. In 1759 Captain John Stuart and a reinforcement of 60 or 70 artillerymen of the South Carolina Provincial Regiment, known as the 'Buffs' after their facing colors, arrived bringing supplies of meat, flour, salt, ammunition and clothing.

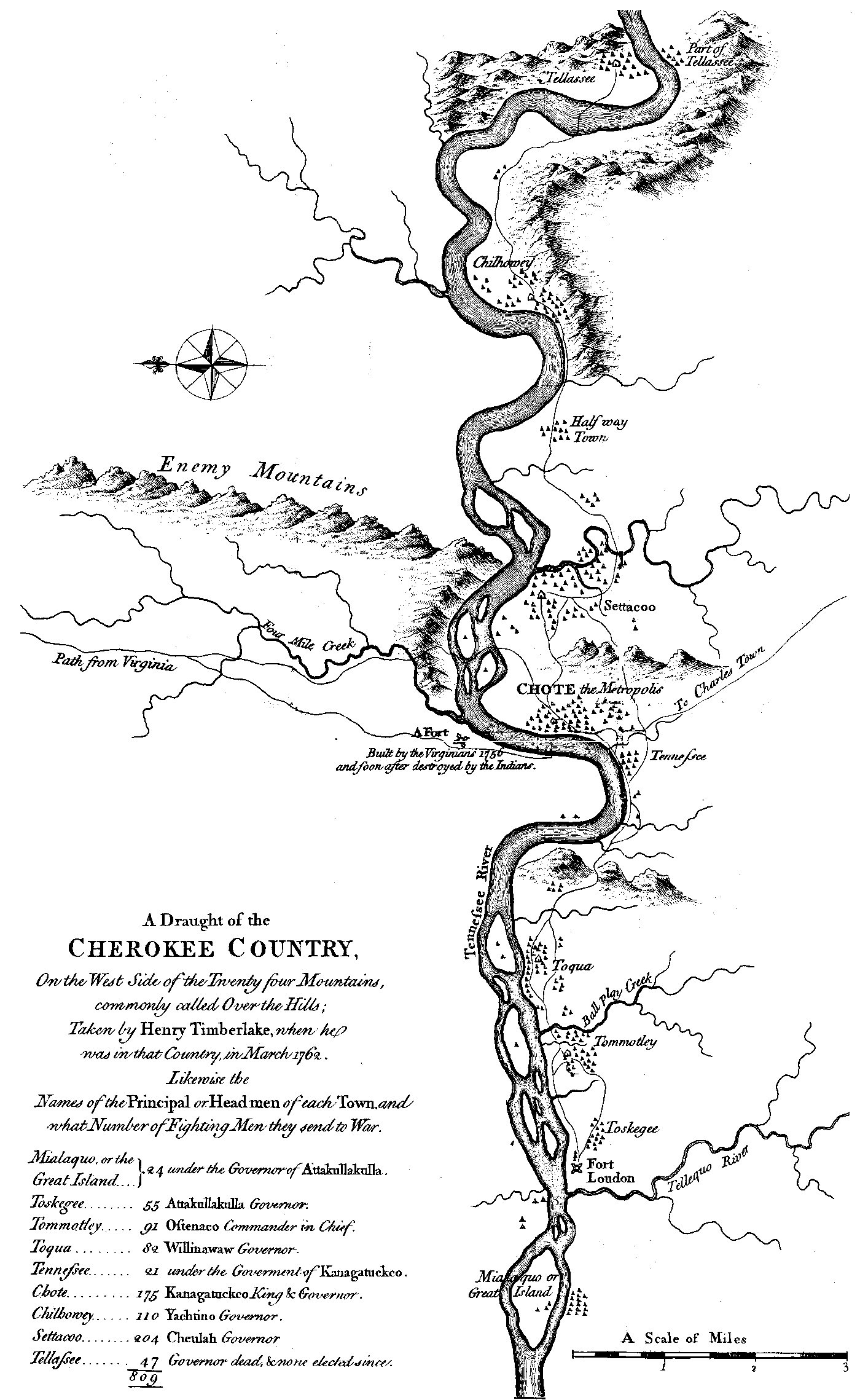
Map of Cherokee Country by Henry Timberlake

The alliance between the Cherokee and the British began to unravel with the British expedition under General Forbes against Fort Dusquesne in 1758. The Cherokee felt their efforts were unappreciated. Conocotocko, then the leading chief of the Cherokee, ordered his warriors home. Later, a contingent of Cherokee warriors under Moytoy accompanied Virginian troops on a campaign against the Shawnee of the Ohio Country. During the expedition, the enemy proved elusive. After several weeks, the Tuscarora contingent left, while that of the Cherokee stayed, but dwindled. Then, a group of Cherokee warriors scalped and killed one or more white settlers and deceptively attempted to proclaim to the British the scalps belonged to their enemies in order to receive a reward. Suspicious of the truth, the British soldiers disarmed and briefly detained them, and then chose to send them home. Some Cherokees, who had not been involved in the treachery, were bitter over this treatment, and raided Virginia's frontier settlements while returning to the Tennessee Valley. Virginia settlers got angry and banded together to pursue the Cherokee, attacking them and killing, scalping and mutilating 20 of the Indians, later collecting the bounty offered for enemy scalps. Although Dinwiddie, the lieutenant governor of Virginia, apologized other Virginians called them horse thieves. Some Cherokees retaliated and the situation spun out of control.

The new governor of South Carolina, William Henry Lyttelton, declared war on the Cherokee in 1759. The governor embargoed all shipments of gunpowder to the Cherokee and raised an army of 1,100 provincial troops which marched to confront the Lower Towns of the Cherokee. Desperate for ammunition for their fall and winter hunts, the nation sent a peace delegation of moderate chiefs to negotiate. The thirty-two chiefs were taken prisoner, as hostages, and, escorted by the provincial army, were sent to Fort Prince George and held in a tiny room only big enough for six people. Three of the chiefs were released conditionally, Lyttleton thought this would ensure peace.

As smallpox broke out among his troops Governor Lyttleton feared the desertion of most of his force and hurried back to Charleston in great disorder. The Cherokee were still angry, and continued to attack frontier settlements into 1760. In February 1760, they attacked Fort Prince George in an attempt to rescue the remaining 16 hostages, killing the fort's commander. The new commander ordered the garrison to move the hostages, which resulted in a confrontation that saw the hostages being killed by the garrison. And two days later the fort fired several artillery shots into the Cherokee town of Keowee. The Cherokee now attacked Fort Ninety Six, but it withstood the siege. However, settlements and lesser posts in the South Carolina backcountry quickly fell to Cherokee raids.

The Cherokee were led by Standing Turkey as Principal Chief, Oconostota (Aganstata) of Chota, Attakullakulla (Atagulgalu) of Tanasi, Ostenaco of Tomotley, Wauhatchie (Wayatsi) of the Lower Towns, and Round O of the Middle Towns. The Cherokee sought allies among the other Indian tribes and help from the French but received no practical aid and faced the British alone. While some Cherokee leaders still called for peace, others led retaliatory raids on outlying pioneer settlements.

== Siege ==
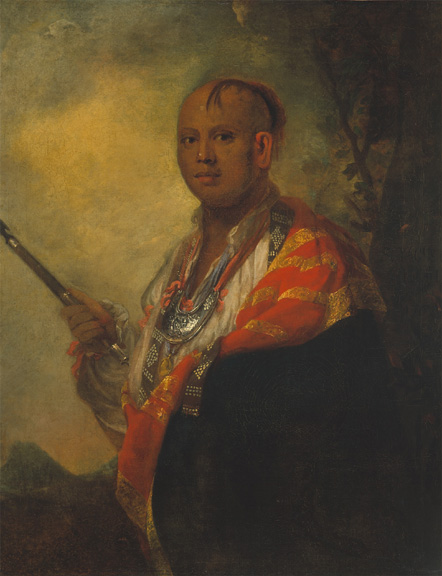
Portrait of Ostenaco by Sir Joshua Reynolds, 1762.

At the commencement of the siege the warriors fired their rifles for a few days at the soldiers in the fort but soon ceased in order to conserve precious ammunition. The Cherokee prevented the soldiers and settlers from leaving the fort to hunt or gather foodstuffs. However, some soldiers were married to Indian women and these women were allowed to come and go because the Cherokee did not wish to start feuds with the women's tribes and families. The women were able to smuggle in some much needed food. However this was not enough to indefinitely sustain the garrison and Demeré had reported to Lyttleton in January that his supplies could only last four months.

The Cherokee cut off the garrison from all other outside aid or communications. When several of Demeré's messengers were either killed or captured and all other white colonists declined to volunteer, Demeré turned to an African-American slave named Abram, to whom he promised freedom as a reward, if he could carry messages through the Indian lines and across the mountains to South Carolina. Abram made the dangerous and harrowing passage several times and was freed by the South Carolina Commons House in a tax bill in 1761.

Governor Lyttleton appealed for help to Jeffrey Amherst, the British commander in North America. Amherst sent Archibald Montgomerie with an army of 1,300 to 1,500 troops including 400 in four companies of the Royal Scots and a 700-man battalion of the Montgomerie's Highlanders to South Carolina in order to mount a second expedition against the Cherokee. His second in command was Major James Grant. The regulars were joined by some 300 mounted Carolina rangers, in seven troops, and 100 militia as well a party of 40 to 50 Catawba warriors.

The two objectives of this second expedition were to subdue the Cherokee by razing their towns and crops, while relieving those posts invested by the Cherokee, in particular, Fort Loudoun. In late May the British had reached Fort Ninety-Six and Montgomerie's campaign burned some of the Cherokee Lower Towns, including Keowee, Estatoe and Sugar Town, killing or capturing around 100 Indians. The British advanced on the Cherokee Middle Towns and some five miles from Etchoe, the lowest town in the Cherokee's middle settlements, Montgomerie's advanced guard of a company of Rangers was ambushed in a deep valley. On June 27 the battle of Echoee ensued in which the British advance was halted and the force's wounded, including Montgomerie, were so numerous and seriously hurt that there was no possibility of leaving the wounded behind and continuing to advance. The invading British were compelled to retire and the relief of Fort Loudoun was abandoned.

The siege ground on through June, July and into August with the garrison reduced to eating the horses and getting progressively weaker every day from hunger and sickness. Several soldiers deserted and others threatened to desert. On August 6 a council of the officers agreed to seek surrender terms. Captain Demeré was refused when he asked to surrender but Captain Stuart, who was well liked by the Indians, reached an agreement with the Cherokee chiefs at Chota.

== Aftermath ==
The failure to relieve Fort Loudoun forced the garrison to surrender with Captain Demeré and the garrison allowed to retain their arms and enough ammunition to make the trip back to the colony provided they left the remaining arms and stores of ammunition to the Cherokee led by Ostenaco. The garrison marched out of the fort on August 9 with a Cherokee escort. The Indians entered the fort and found 10 bags of powder and ball buried and the cannon and small arms thrown in the river to keep them from the Cherokee. Some of the Indians, angered by the broken agreement, held a secret council and decided to go after the garrison.

The next morning the garrison's Indian escort had drifted off and the garrison was attacked in the woods by perhaps 700 Indians. Some 22 soldiers, including all the officers except Stuart, roughly equal to the number of Cherokee chief hostages killed at Fort Prince George, and 3 civilians were killed and 120 or more were taken prisoners. Captain Demeré alone was tortured, scalped, made to dance and beaten until he died for betraying the surrender agreement.

Captain Stuart was saved from the initial massacre of the soldiers by the intervention of a Cherokee woman, likely his wife, Susannah, who ran in among the soldiers during the firing to shield him. As commander of the artillery, it was Ostenaco's plan to force Stuart to show the Cherokee how to use the 12 captured cannon against the other British forts. Stuart had a great friend among the Indians, Attakullakulla - the Little Carpenter, who first ransomed and then aided Stuart to escape. Stuart would later on January 5, 1762, be appointed Royal Superintendent of Indian Affairs for the Southern Districts of North America and hold this office for 18 years.

Panic and consternation reigned in Charleston at the news of the fall of the fort. A truce of six months was agreed to during which peace attempts failed. After a difficult winter for the Cherokee due to the loss of the Lower Towns' harvest and shortage of ammunition for hunting, as well as disease, Cherokee morale still remained high. In a goodwill gesture, the Cherokee allowed Fort Prince George to receive a limited amount of supplies and even though it was almost as vulnerable as Fort Loudoun had been the Cherokee did not put it under close siege.

Amherst subsequently determined to launch a third and greater invasion of the Cherokee lands "to chastise the Cherokees [and] reduce them to the absolute necessity of suing for pardon,". James Grant was now in command with more regulars: the 1st, 17th and 22nd Regiments, a war-party of Mohawks and Stockbridge Indian scouts, Catawba and Chickasaw warriors; a large number of provincials under Colonel Middleton that included several who would gain fame during the American Revolution: William Moultrie, Charles Cotesworth Pinckney and Francis Marion and rangers. His force was more than 2,800 strong. Grant would be met by 1,000 Cherokee warriors on June 10, 1761 near the site of the previous battle of Echoee. The Cherokee fought until their limited ammunition was exhausted and then withdrew.

Grant's force then proceeded to burn the fifteen Middle Towns and all the crops. Grant expressly ordered the troops to summarily execute any Indian man, woman or child they captured. Although, by July, Grant had marched his men to exhaustion with 300 too sick to walk, he had wrecked the Cherokee economy and made 4,000 inhabitants of the Middle Towns homeless and starving. In August 1761 the Cherokee sued for peace.

Following the destruction of Fort Loudoun, Amherst dispatched yet another force from Virginia under Colonel William Byrd in 1761. While Byrd moved against the Middle Towns, he dispatched Colonel Adam Stephen to attack the Overhill Towns. Stephen arrived at Long Island of the Holston in 1761, and proceeded to construct Fort Robinson. Concerned over this invasion force, the Overhill Cherokee sent Chief Old Hop (Conocotocko) to Long Island of the Holston to seek peace. Colonel Stephen agreed, and peace was concluded in November 1761, before any action took place. At the behest of the Cherokee, Stephen dispatched Lieutenant Henry Timberlake on an expedition to the Overhill country to consolidate peace with the various villages. A journal and map created by Timberlake during this expedition would later prove invaluable to early explorers and settlers of Tennessee.

== Bibliography ==
- Anderson, Fred. Crucible of War: The Seven Years’ War and the Fate of Empire in British North America, 1754–1766. New York: Knopf, 2000. ISBN 0-375-40642-5.
- Bancroft, George. History of the United States, from the Discovery of the American Continent, Vol. IV, Boston, 1872.
- Conley, Robert J..The Cherokee Nation: A History, University of New Mexico Press, 2005, ISBN 978-0-8263-3234-9.
- Drake, Samuel Gardner. Biography and history of the Indians of North America, Boston, MDCCCLI.
- Fortescue J. W.. A History of the British Army, MacMillan, London, 1899, Vol. II.
- Foster, Thomas A., ed.. New Men: Manliness in Early America, New York University Press, 2011, ISBN 978-0-8147-2781-2.
- Hatley, Thomas. The Dividing Paths: Cherokees and South Carolinians through the Era of Revolution. New York: Oxford University Press, 1993.
- Kaufmann, J.E., Kaufmann, H.W..Fortress America: The Forts That Defended America, 1600 to the Present, Da Capo Press, 2004, ISBN 0-306-81294-0.
- Keenan, Jerry. Encyclopedia of American Indian Wars, 1492-1890, New York, 1999, ISBN 0-393-31915-6.
- Mooney, James. Myths of the Cherokee and Sacred Formulas of the Cherokee. Dover, 1995.
- Oliphant, John. Peace and War on the Anglo-Cherokee Frontier, 1756–63. Baton Rouge, LA: Louisiana State University Press, 2001.
- Stewart, David, Major General. Sketches of the character, manners, and present state of the Highlanders, Vols 1 & 2. Edinburgh, 1825.
- Woodward, Grace Steele.The Cherokees, University of Oklahoma Press, 1963, ISBN 0-8061-1815-6.
