= Henry Timberlake =

Colonial officer and explorer (1730 or 1735-1765)

- Born: 1730 or 1735; Hanover County, Virginia
- Died: September 30, 1765
- Occupations: Military officer, journalist, and cartographer
- Known for: British colonial emissary to the Overhill Cherokee

Henry Timberlake (1730 or 1735 – September 30, 1765) was a colonial Anglo-American officer, journalist, and cartographer. He was born in the Colony of Virginia and died in England. He is best known for his work as an emissary from the British colonies to the Overhill Cherokee during the 1761–1762 Timberlake Expedition.

Timberlake's account of his journeys to the Cherokee, published posthumously as his memoirs in 1765, became a primary source for later studies of the people's eighteenth-century culture. His detailed descriptions of Cherokee towns, townhouses (also known as councilhouses), weapons, and tools have been invaluable to later historians and anthropologists. The details have helped them identify Cherokee structures and cultural objects uncovered at modern archaeological excavation sites throughout the southern Appalachian region. For instance, during the Tellico Archaeological Project prior to construction of the Tellico Dam, which included a series of salvage excavations conducted in the lower Little Tennessee River basin in the 1970s, archaeologists used Timberlake's map, known as Draught of the Cherokee Country, to help locate major Overhill village sites.

== Early life and career ==
Henry Timberlake was born in Hanover County, Virginia to Francis and Sarah (née Austin) Timberlake. The Dictionary of American Biography says that Timberlake was born in 1730; Timberlake's age as recorded on his marriage license implies that he was born in 1735. According to his memoir, Timberlake was a grandson of Henry Timberlake, a member of the Company of Merchant Adventurers of London and the Virginia Company. The senior Henry Timberlake had traveled to Virginia from England, trading and acquiring property there and in Bermuda. But his family did not leave England, and he returned there, where he died in August 1626 and was buried. Timberlake's father, Francis, settled in Virginia.

After his father Francis died, Timberlake inherited a small fortune, but he still had to support himself, and sought a military career in the colony. In 1756, at the outset of the French and Indian War, Timberlake joined a Virginia militia company known as the "Patriot Blues". It had embarked on a campaign to expel French and allied Native American raiders from the western part of the colony. Shortly thereafter, he applied for a commission in the Virginia regiment—then commanded by George Washington—but was denied due to a lack of vacancies.

In 1758, Timberlake successfully applied for a commission in Colonel William Byrd's recently formed 2nd Virginia Regiment. Commissioned as an ensign, the entry rank, Timberlake accompanied the regiment on its march to Fort Duquesne (site of the future city of Pittsburgh), but illness kept him from proceeding further. In 1759, he took part in several minor operations in the present-day Pittsburgh area, mostly overseeing the construction of defensive works.

In 1760, British relations with the Cherokee, which had been moderately friendly for several decades, grew sour after South Carolina authorities killed 22 Cherokee chiefs captured in battle and held prisoner (as hostages) at Fort Prince George.

In early 1760, the Overhill Cherokee laid siege to Fort Loudoun, a remote British outpost on the lower Little Tennessee River east of its tributary Telloquo River (in what is now Tennessee). They were trying to expel the British from this area. The garrison held out until August of that year, but was forced to surrender due to lack of provisions. A relief column under Archibald Montgomerie failed to reach the fort after burning the Cherokee Lower Towns along the Savannah River in South Carolina and being stopped at the Battle of Echoee. In spite of the garrison's leaving Fort Loudoun under a flag of truce, the Cherokee killed 22 of its members on their march back across the mountains, in retaliation for the colonists' earlier killing of 22 Cherokee in South Carolina.

In 1761, Jeffery Amherst, the British commander in North America, directed a larger invasion force against the Cherokee Middle Towns, sending James Grant with forces. These were located along the upper Little Tennessee River valley in North Carolina. William Byrd was assigned to threaten the Overhill towns, which were located on the other side of the Appalachian mountains, along the lower Little Tennessee and upper Tennessee rivers, in what is now Tennessee.

While Grant proceeded to destroy the Cherokee Middle towns in North Carolina, William Byrd dispatched Colonel Adam Stephen into the Holston River valley to attack the Overhill towns. Timberlake accompanied Stephen to Long Island of the Holston (in modern-day Sullivan County, Tennessee), where they began building a base known as "Fort Robinson", and made preparations for a march south.

== Journey to the Overhill country ==
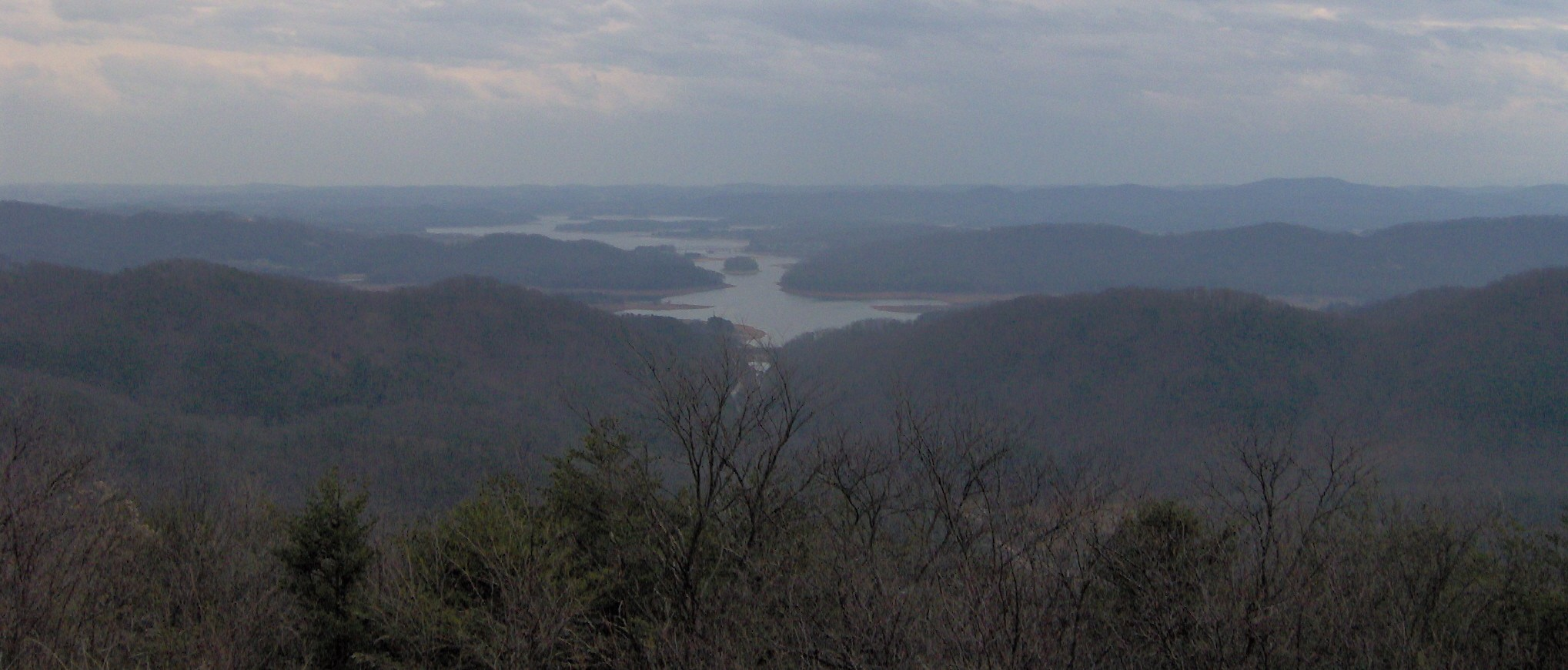
The Holston Valley

On November 19, 1761, as Fort Robinson was nearing completion, a 400-man Cherokee force led by Chief Kanagatucko (or "Old Hop") arrived at the British camp and asked for peace, which was immediately granted by Col. Stephen. Kanagatucko asked for an officer to accompany him to the Overhill towns as proof that hostilities had ended. Stephen was reluctant to allow it, but granted the request when Timberlake volunteered.

Timberlake was accompanied by Sergeant Thomas Sumter, an interpreter named John McCormack, and an unnamed servant. The group purchased a canoe and ten days' worth of provisions with money Sumter had borrowed. The plan was to follow the Holston River to its confluence with the French Broad River, and proceed to the lower Little Tennessee River, where the Overhill towns were situated.

Timberlake's party left Long Island on November 28, 1761. The Holston River's unusually low water levels almost immediately stalled the journey, as the party was forced to drag their canoe over exposed shoals and sandbars. The party ran out of provisions after several days, but McCormack managed to shoot a bear, supplying them with several days' worth of meat. Around December 7, the party explored a stalactite-filled cave situated approximately 50 feet above the river. Timberlake described an incident in which Sumter swam nearly a half-mile in near-freezing river waters to retrieve their canoe, which had somehow drifted away while they were exploring the cave.

On December 13, the expedition reached a series of treacherous cascades that Timberlake called "Great Falls". The party had to take a day to carefully maneuver their way down the cascades, only to find the Holston frozen over immediately downstream. The ice slowed the expedition's progress, but rains on the night of December 14 thawed the ice. The party passed through the mouth of the Holston (where modern Knoxville developed ) into what is now known as the Tennessee River on December 15.

=== Overhill country ===
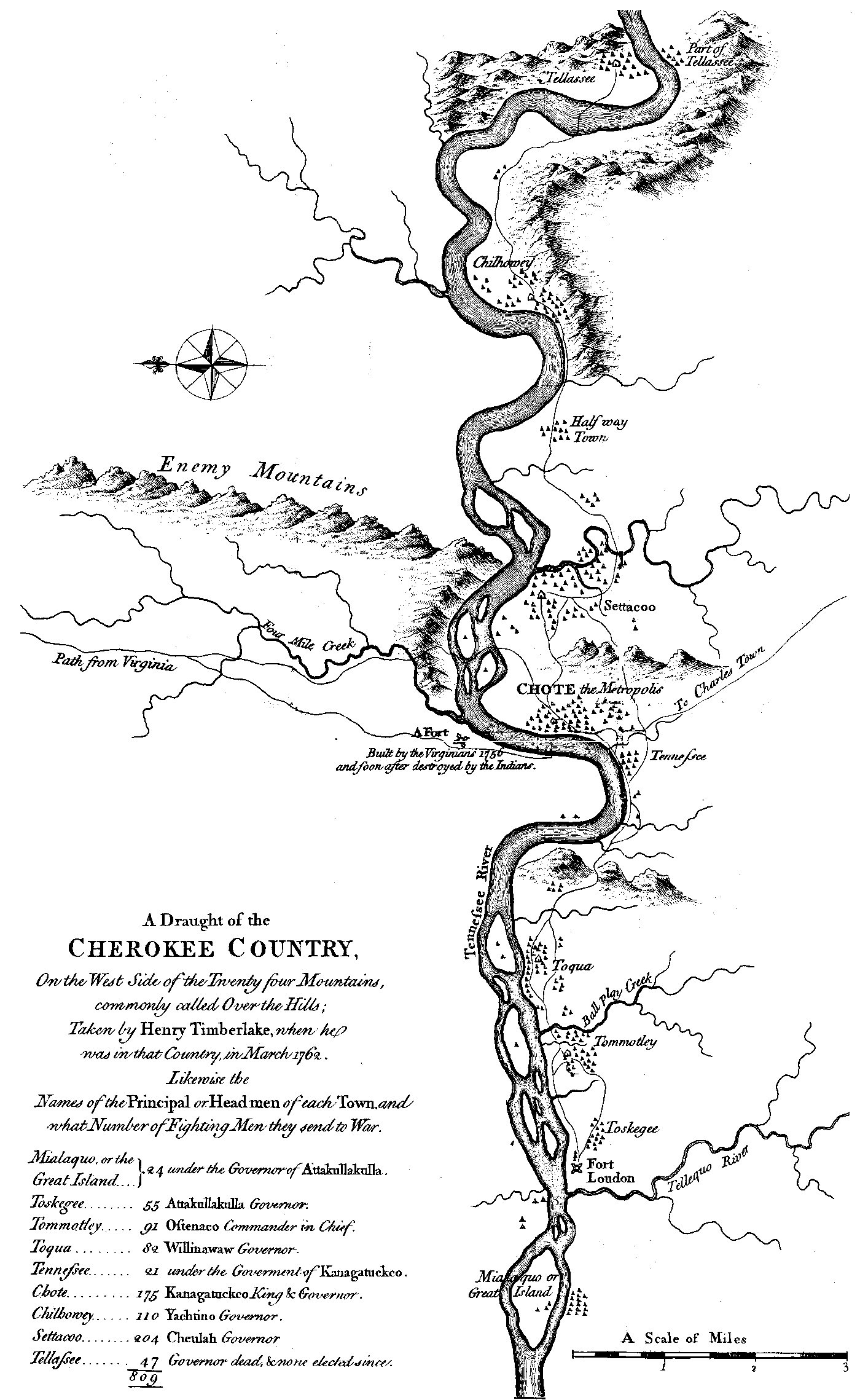
Timberlake's Draught of the Cherokee Country, 1762

The deeper waters of the Tennessee River allowed the Timberlake expedition to proceed much more quickly. A hunting party led by Cherokee chief Slave Catcher met the Timberlake expedition near the mouth of the Little Tennessee River. They supplied the weary expedition with provisions of "dried venison, homminy, and boiled corn". The following day, Slave Catcher guided the expedition by canoe up the Little Tennessee, although the Timberlake party struggled to keep up. Timberlake recalled, "my hands were so galled, that the blood trickled from them, and when we set out the next morning I was scarce able to handle a pole." The Timberlake party arrived in the Overhill town of Tomotley on December 20, where they were greeted by the town's head man, Chief Ostenaco.

After spending several days in Tomotley as guests of Ostenaco, Timberlake and McCormack proceeded to the Overhill mother town of Chota, where a number of chiefs had gathered in the town's large councilhouse. Ostenaco gave a speech and ceremoniously buried a hatchet in the ground, symbolizing a state of peace between the English and the Cherokee. Afterward, Timberlake participated in a peace ceremony in which he smoked several ceremonial pipes of tobacco with the gathered chiefs. He said he found this practice "very disagreeable," but he took part without openly complaining.

Timberlake and Ostenaco continued southward to Citico, where Timberlake was greeted by a ceremonial dance involving some 400 Cherokee. Timberlake recalled that the dancers were "painted all over in a hideous manner" and that they "danced in a very uncommon figure". The town's chief, Cheulah, presented Timberlake with a string of beads and held another pipe-smoking ceremony. The non-stop pipe smoking made Timberlake so sick that he "could not stir for several hours".

The following day, Timberlake and Ostenaco traveled to Chilhowee, where the town's chief, Yachtino, held a peace procession similar to that at Citico.

=== Return to Virginia ===
His assignment largely completed, Timberlake returned to Tomotley with Ostenaco on January 2, 1762. He spent the next few weeks studying Cherokee habits and making notes for his map of the Overhill country. At the end of January, rumors began trickling in from Cherokee scouts of renewed hostilities with rival tribes to the north. Although the rumors were found to be based on a misunderstanding, Timberlake grew anxious and begged Ostenaco to guide him back to Virginia. Ostenaco reluctantly agreed, and the party set out on March 10, 1762. Just before departure, Timberlake witnessed the ceremonial return of a war party led by Chief Willinawaw. The party sang "the war-song" and planted a scalp-filled pole next to the councilhouse door.

The Timberlake party decided to make the return trip overland, having purchased horses from the Cherokee. Ostenaco, accompanied by several hundred Cherokee warriors, guided the Timberlake group northward via the Great Indian Warpath, which follows the western base of the Appalachian Mountains. On March 11, the party arrived at the abandoned village of Elajoy along Little River (near present-day Maryville, Tennessee), and crossed the French Broad River the following day. A week later, they reached Fort Robinson. The Stephen garrison had abandoned it but left supplies of a large amount of flour.

The expedition left Long Island of the Holston on March 22, continuing northward to an army camp where Timberlake had earlier left some belongings. He was deeply disappointed to find that his trunk had been looted, and most of his goods had been stolen. The party went through the mountains and finally reached Williamsburg, Virginia in the Tidewater area along the James River in early April.

== Visits to London ==
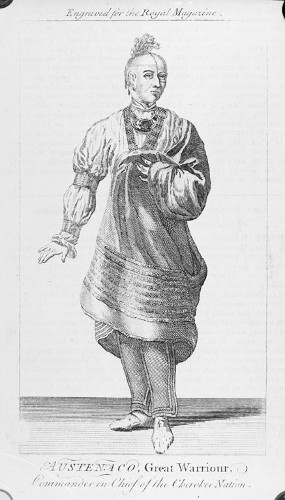
Drawing of Chief Ostenaco during his visit to London, 1762, by Sir Joshua Reynolds

While in Williamsburg, Timberlake and Ostenaco attended a dinner party at the College of William & Mary; that evening Ostenaco said he would like to meet the king of England. Although he feared the trip would break him financially, Timberlake agreed to arrange such a trip and meeting for the chief. In May 1762, Timberlake, Sumter, and three distinguished Cherokee leaders, including Ostenaco, departed for London.

Arriving in early June, the Cherokee chiefs were an immediate attraction, drawing crowds all over the city. The poet Oliver Goldsmith waited for three hours to meet the Cherokee, and offered a gift to Ostenaco. They sat for Sir Joshua Reynolds to paint their portraits, and they met personally with King George III. The Cherokee completed their return voyage to North America with Sergeant Sumter on about August 25, 1762. Timberlake remained in England dealing with some financial difficulties. He was appointed by Jeffery Amherst, who had been promoted to Crown Governor of Virginia, as a lieutenant in the "42nd or Royal Highland Regiment of foot". Timberlake's increased pay from this commission enabled the officer to pay for his return voyage to Virginia in March 1763.

After reaching Virginia, Timberlake set out for New York to meet with Amherst to receive his commission. Not long afterwards, he received notice that he was among a number of officers to be reduced to half pay following the end of the Seven Years' War. Timberlake left the militia and returned home to Virginia to petition the General Assembly to compensate him for his expenses for the journey, but was denied.

In the summer of 1764, five Cherokee visited Timberlake, seeking an audience with the governor of Virginia and requesting passage to London. The Cherokee wished to appeal to King George to enforce the Proclamation Line of 1763, which restricted colonists to settlements east of the Appalachians, because they suffered continuing encroachment by white settlers on Cherokee land. The governor denied their request, but Timberlake agreed to help them. He accompanied three Cherokee to London in the fall of 1764. Not long after their arrival, the benefactor of the trip fell ill and died. George Montagu-Dunk (Lord Halifax) refused to grant the Cherokee an audience, as the trip was unauthorized. However, on 12 February 1765 they 'attended at the Plantation office and communicated the messages entrusted to them by their nation’. They also ‘exhibited a complaint of encroachment upon their lands. The Committee gave them “assurances of ample redress” ’ and the Colony Agent for Virginia, Edward Montagu, was charged with costing their return to South Carolina and 'the provision of gifts'. Timberlake was accused of attempting to profit off the public attention given to the Cherokee. The government sent the Cherokee back to North America in March 1765. Shortly after their departure, Timberlake was arrested for failing to pay the debt for the last bill for lodging of himself and the Cherokee. He likely wrote his Memoirs while incarcerated.

== Family ==
Timberlake had fathered a son named Richard Timberlake, by one of Ostenaco's daughters, Sakinney. In his old age, former chief Ostenaco lived in retirement with his grandson, Richard Timberlake. While still in London in early 1763, Timberlake married an English woman, Eleanor Binel. They married on 27 January 1763 at St. George's Church, Mayfair.

== Legacy ==
Timberlake's primary legacy is the journal he kept while living with the Cherokee. The volume was published in 1765, likely following Timberlake's death in September of that year. The journal is of importance both as an ethnological study, as it contains detailed descriptions of various facets of Cherokee society, and as a historical account, as it gives insight into Cherokee political decision-making and the tribe's early reactions to the encroaching European colonists.

Along with Cherokee methods of warfare, Timberlake described their agricultural and hunting customs, religious beliefs, birth and death rites, and marital habits. He described Cherokee government as a "mixed aristocracy and democracy," with chiefs chosen on the basis of merit. He also described Cherokee methods for building canoes and dwellings, and the general size and form of Cherokee summer and winter houses. Timberlake's description of the Cherokee councilhouse (the central public structure in a typical Cherokee village and usually built on top of a prehistoric platform mound) has aided archaeologists in locating such structures at modern excavation sites.

Timberlake's map, entitled A Draught of the Cherokee Country, was published to accompany the journal. On it he located all the Cherokee villages on the lower Little Tennessee River and provided important demographic information about village sizes, populations, and leaders. Modern studies have generally confirmed that Timberlake's map was remarkably accurate. The journal, simply entitled Memoirs, and his map of the Overhill Cherokee country, have both been reprinted several times. Timberlake's Memoirs is still considered one of the best contemporary accounts of the 18th-century Cherokee.
