= Henry Timberlake (merchant adventurer) =

English ship captain and merchant adventurer

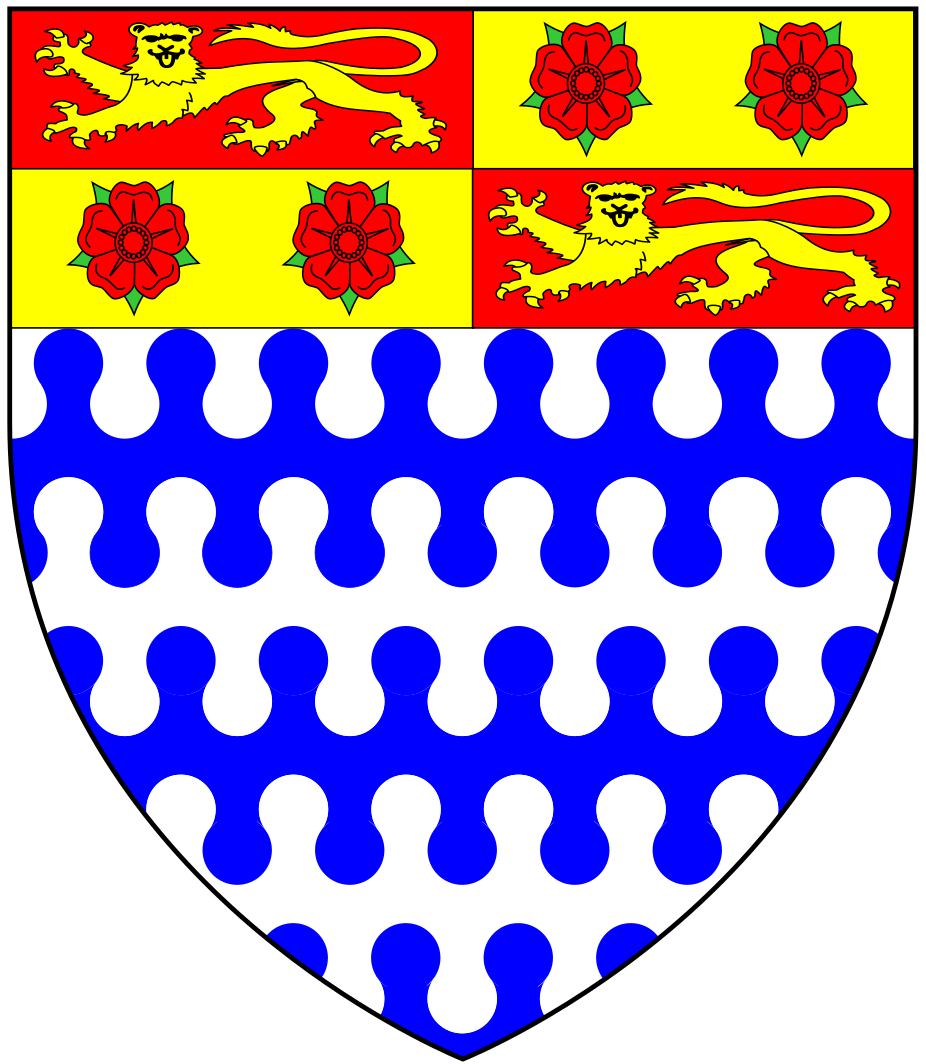
Arms of the Company of Merchant Adventurers of London

Henry Timberlake (1570 – 1625) was an English merchant and member of the Company of Merchant Adventurers of London, a trading guild founded in the early 15th century. Born in 1570, Timberlake eventually acquired enough capital to join the guild sometime before 1601. In addition to his business relationships, Timberlake became known for his travels in North Africa, Egypt, and Jerusalem in 1601, which he recounted and published in 1603. Accounts of his travels proved popular in England and were subsequently reprinted in several editions.

Timberlake later traveled to the English colonies in the Americas, where he purchased land in Virginia and Bermuda. He subsequently returned to England, where he died in 1625.

== Early life and pilgrimage ==
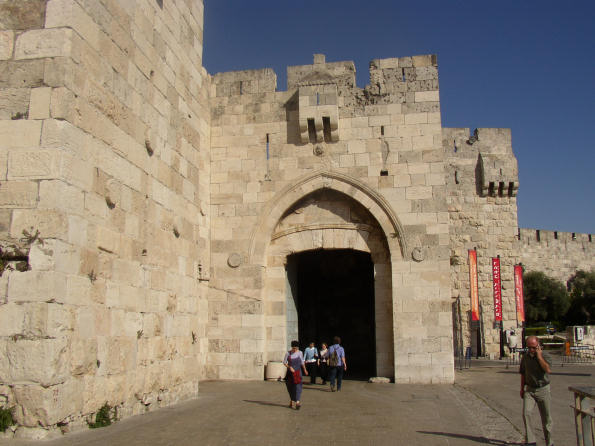
The Jaffa Gate in Jerusalem. Here Timberlake made an error by admitting to his faith and nationality, as he was thrown in jail as a result.

Henry Timberlake was born in England in 1570. Timberlake became a merchant, eventually acquiring enough capital to join the Company of Merchant Adventurers of London, a trading guild, sometime before 1601. He purchased and outfitted merchant ships for conducting trade with merchants in North Africa and Egypt. In 1601, Timberlake sailed into the Mediterranean onboard his merchantmen Trojan (also recorded as Troyan), picking up Muslim travelers in Algiers who were bound for Mecca and Tunis. Timberlake, along with assistant Waldred, transferred his Levant Company goods for an overland trip to the River Nile, then transferred the goods again to sail downriver to Cairo. Finding no luck in his attempts to sell his goods in the city, Timberlake arranged travel for a pilgrimage to Jerusalem accompanied by another Englishman, John Burrell of Middlesbrough.

The journey was considered by many pilgrims to be an exceedingly hazardous one, as travellers were often subject to attacks by bandits along the roads. In addition, Jerusalem was under the rule of the Islamic Ottomans, and dominated by Muslims. A Moroccan who had embarked upon Trojan as a passenger in Algiers encountered Timberlake again at Mamre, near Hebron, as part of a large Syrian cavaran. The man promised to help Timberlake during his pilgrimage. When the caravan reached Jerusalem, Timberlake identified himself at the Jaffa Gate as a Protestant and an Englishman; he was arrested and accused by the Ottoman authorities of being a spy, who had never heard of England or Queen Elizabeth. The Moroccan companion of Timberlake interceded on his behalf, securing his release after appealing directly to the local Pasha. He saved Timberlake's life again when the two men were attacked by Bedouins while riding upon camels they had hired at Gaza for their return to Cairo; the Bedouins intended to sell the pair into slavery. The unnamed Moroccan managed to ward the Bedouin off before the two made good their escape.

== Written account of his travels ==
Timberlake eventually managed to return to England from the Middle East. After his return, Timberlake wrote a lengthy letter about his adventures to friends in London; it was published in 1603 as A True and Strange Discourse on the Travailes of Two English Pilgrims. Highly popular among the English public, it was reprinted in numerous subsequent editions. Timberlake wrote with a vivid narrative style. Among the unusual elements was his account of the friendship with the unnamed Muslim from Fes, Morocco. Timberlake recorded in great detail the man's aid and his role in twice saving the Englisman's life.

Timberlake's account is considered to be a vivid glimpse into the history of Palestine and the situation of Christians there during the period of Ottoman rule. The local Pasha insisted that Timberlake stay in a Franciscan hospice, as he was indifferent about tensions among Christian groups. Timberlake expressed a grudging respect for the Catholic friars in his account. They washed his feet in a ritual greeting, and while he had feared being forced to participate in a Catholic mass, there was no such effort. Timberlake's positive depictions of Catholics and Muslims were viewed with suspicion by some in England, and an unflattering caricature of him was printed in an unauthorised version of his account.

== Later years ==
Timberlake's account would prove to be his first and only foray into writing, although he continued his trading activities. He eventually became a member of the joint-stock Virginia Company, which was founded to establish colonies in North America. He sailed to the young Virginia Colony, where he purchased land in Smith's Hundred. Timberlake also sailed to the English colony of Bermuda, where he also purchased land. He leased his properties to aspiring farmers or hired overseers to the land in his name, with the properties being used to cultivate and produce valuable cash crops.

Timberlake returned to England after his brief sojourn in the Americas. After his return, Timberlake died in September 1625, in Titchfield, near Fareham, Hampshire. There he had been closely associated over the years with the Earl of Southampton, who was also a member of the Virginia Company. Wriothesley had started an industrial ironworks in Titchfield.

Timberlake was buried in the chancel of the St. Peter's Church in Titchfield, as were Southampton and his eldest son, who had both died of disease in the Low Countries in 1624. Timberlake had married and had a family in England. A grandson, also called Henry Timberlake, later emigrated from England to Newport, Rhode Island.

One of Timberlake's sons, Francis, emigrated to Virginia where he settled (or, he may have traveled there earlier with his father and stayed to administer his properties). He married there and his son, Henry Timberlake, was born in 1730 or 1735 in Hanover County, Virginia. He joined the militia and also became known as a cartographer. He is known especially for his work and memoir of his Timberlake Expedition of 1761–1762 to the Overhill Cherokee, based in present-day Tennessee. He thoroughly documented the Cherokee settlements and elements of their culture.

== Sources ==
- Henry Timberlake, A True and Strange Discourse on the Travailes (trauailes) of two English Pilgrims, Thomas Archer, 1603
- Joan Taylor, The Englishman, the Moor and the Holy City: The True Adventures of an Elizabethan Traveller, Stroud: Tempus, 2006 ISBN 0-7524-4009-8
