= Overhill Cherokee =

18th century Cherokee people who lived on the west side of the Appalachian Mountains

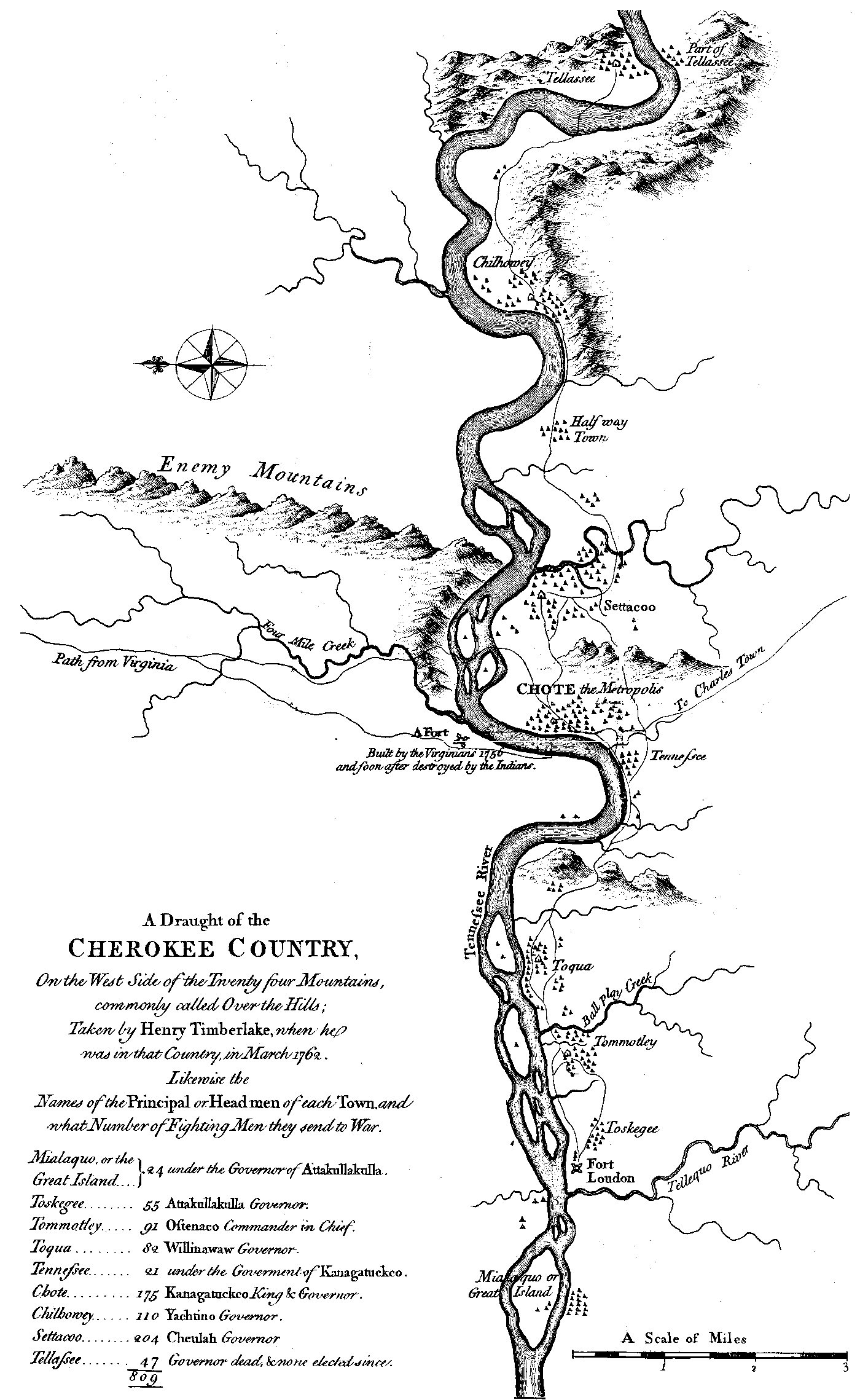
Timberlake's "Draught of the Cherokee Country." Timberlake's "Tennessee River" is now known as the Little Tennessee River. North is to the left.

The Overhill Cherokee were a group of the Cherokee people located in their historic settlements in what is now the U.S. state of Tennessee in the Southeastern United States, on the western side of the Appalachian Mountains. This name was used by 18th-century European traders and explorers from British colonies along the Atlantic coast, as they had to cross the mountains to reach these settlements.

Situated along the lower Little Tennessee, lower Tellico, lower Hiwassee and upper Tennessee rivers, the Overhill towns rose to prominence within the Cherokee Nation in the early 18th century. They began to standardize trade with British colonists. In the early part of the century, the Overhill towns' remote location at the far end of the Trading Path meant they were reached only by those traders and explorers adventurous enough to make the difficult journey to the interior over the mountain range. By the middle of the century, the Overhill towns were consistently courted by both British and French emissaries, as the two powers struggled for the control of the North American continent and the lucrative fur trade.

During and following the American Revolutionary War, in the late 18th and early 19th centuries, the westward thrust of Euro-American settlement resulted in conflict and the decline of the Overhill towns. The Cherokee were forced to cede most of their lands in this area through a series of unfavorable treaties with the United States. For a time, they migrated to the south and west, deeper into Georgia and Alabama, and away from settler pressure.

The Overhill town of Chota, in present-day Monroe County, Tennessee, was recognized as the de facto capital and mother town of the entire Cherokee Nation for most of the 18th century, when it was the major settlement. The town of Tanasi became the namesake for the state of Tennessee. Many prominent Cherokee leaders, including Attakullakulla, Oconastota, Nancy Ward, and Sequoyah, were born and raised in Overhill towns.

== 20th century to present ==
In the 1970s, most of the former Overhill sites were submerged by the impoundment of the Little Tennessee River after a dam was constructed in a major Tennessee Valley Authority project. Archaeologists conducted extensive excavations prior to this, during which they identified most of the Overhill towns and extracted thousands of artifacts, helping them develop volumes of invaluable information regarding the region's Cherokee and pre-Cherokee inhabitants. They learned that different cultures of Indigenous peoples had lived along the river for 12,000 years.

== Geography ==
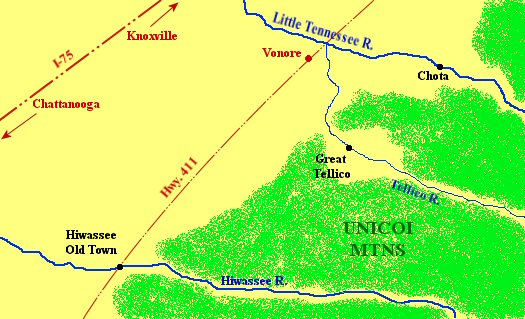
Approximate location of the three major Overhill towns in modern East Tennessee. Red lines and letters show modern roads and towns.

The Overhill settlements were concentrated around three rivers at the base of the Great Smoky Mountains and the Unicoi Mountains, in what are now Monroe and Polk counties in Tennessee. The northernmost of these three rivers, the Little Tennessee, was the locus of a string of prominent Overhill settlements situated between modern-day Vonore and Calderwood Dam. Other important settlements were situated along the Hiwassee River south of modern Etowah, and along the Tellico River in modern Tellico Plains.

Although Native Americans used most of the western side of the Great Smoky Mountains primarily as a hunting ground, early Euro-American explorers recalled seeing abandoned villages and temporary hunting camps scattered around the region. These were often found in the game-rich coves of the northern part of the range and near the junctions of major streams.

=== Prominent Overhill villages ===
Mialoquo (Amaye'le'gwa) – located in present-day Monroe County, on a now-submerged island in the middle of the Little Tennessee River. This was just north of the modern U.S. Route 411 bridge. Mooney believed Mialoquo might have been the village of Nilaque, which the naturalist John Bartram recorded visiting. The term "Mialoquo" means "Great Island." 35.61534°N 84.24048°W

Tuskegee (Taskigi) – located at the confluence of the Tellico and Little Tennessee rivers south of modern-day Fort Loudoun State Park. Tuskegee was the birthplace of Sequoyah, noted as the first person to independently create a written alphabet, which he did for the Cherokee language. 35.59167°N 84.20222°W

Tomotley – located in present-day Monroe County, adjacent to Toqua along the Little Tennessee River. Timberlake reported a councilhouse in Tomotley where a "death hallow" was sounded to signify the return of a war party. 35.57182°N 84.18697°W

Toqua (Dakwa) – located in present-day Monroe County, at the confluence of Toco Creek and the Little Tennessee River, just south of modern-day Fort Loudoun State Park. 35.56984°N 84.17248°W

Tanasi – located in present-day Monroe County, adjacent to Chota along the Little Tennessee River. The town was the capital of the Overhill Cherokee c. 1721–1730. The Little Tennessee was originally simply called the "Tennessee," which was an alternate spelling of "Tanasi." European-American settlers eventually applied the name to the entire state. 35.55005°N 84.13374°W

Chota (Itsa'sa) – located in present-day Monroe County, along the Little Tennessee River, about 10 miles (16 km) south of modern-day Vonore. Chota was the de facto Cherokee capital in the mid-18th century, considered a 'mother town,' and the birthplace of several prominent chiefs. At the time of Timberlake's visit in 1761, Chota was centered around a large councilhouse, which could seat 500, and about 60 residential houses. The town's name is sometimes spelled "Echota." 35.55507°N 84.13104°W

Citico (Si'tiku) – located in present-day Monroe County, at the confluence of Citico Creek and the Little Tennessee River. The town's name is sometimes spelled "Settaco." 35.54887°N 84.09891°W

Chilhowee (Tsu'lun'we) – located in present-day Blount and Monroe counties at the confluence of Abrams Creek and the Little Tennessee River. The junction of modern U.S. Route 129 and Foothills Parkway is nearby. 35.55231°N 84.00737°W

Tallassee (Ta'lasi) – located in present-day Blount and Monroe counties along the Little Tennessee River, a mile or so downstream from the modern Calderwood Dam. The modern town of Tallassee is situated much further downstream, and its location should not be confused with that of the ancient village. The Cherokee Tallassee is sometimes referred to as "Tallassee Old Town." 35.50556°N 84.00028°W

Great Tellico (Talikwa) – located in present-day Monroe County, in Tellico Plains, where the Tellico River levels out at the base of the Unicoi Mountains. Great Tellico rose to prominence in early 18th century under its chief Moytoy. Sir Alexander Cuming, who visited the town in 1730, reported that Great Tellico had the fiercest warriors of all the Overhill towns. Great Tellico's sister town, Chatuga, was also located in the valley. 35.36627°N 84.28745°W

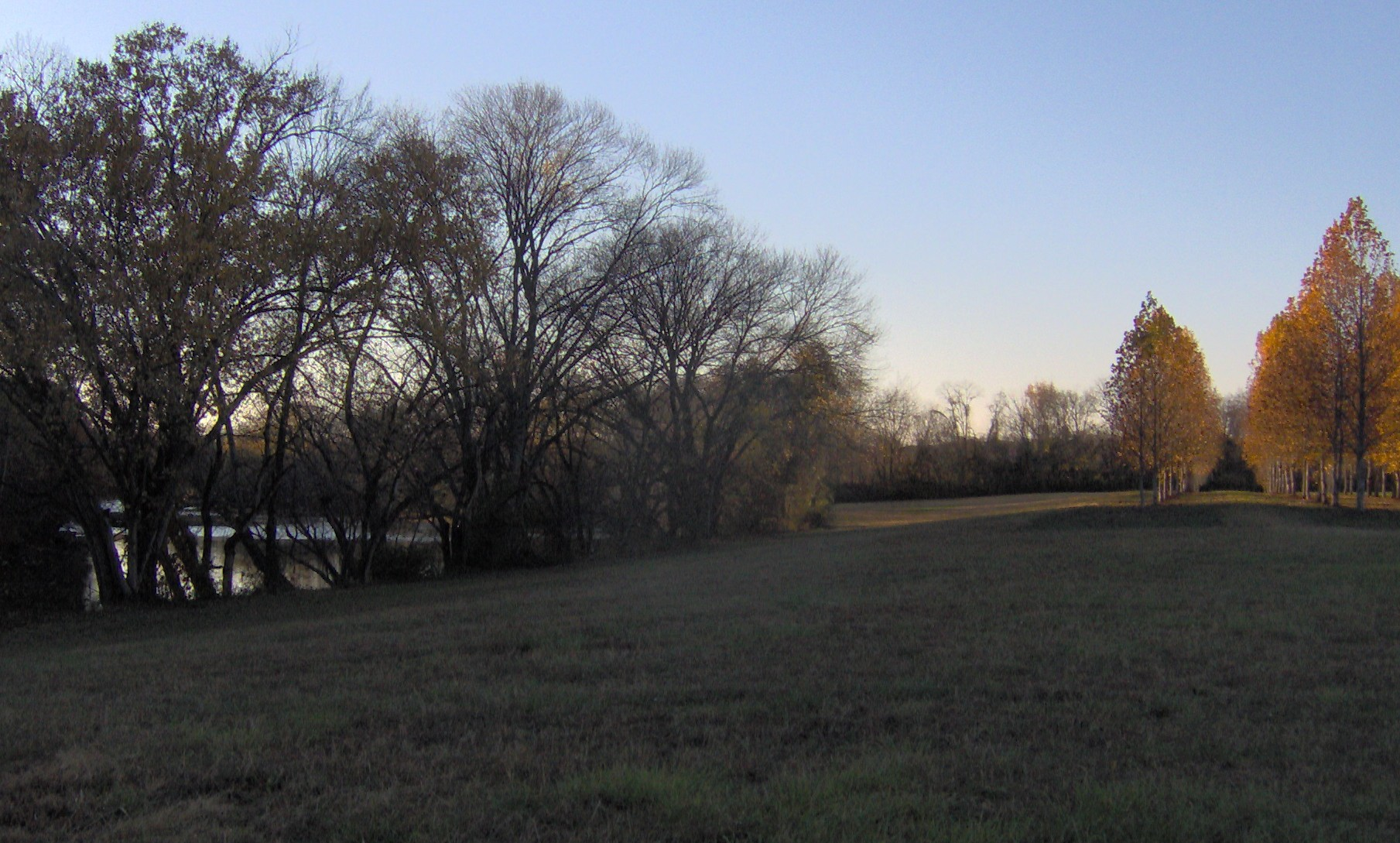
The site of Great Hiwassee along US-411 near Etowah, Tennessee. The Hiwassee River is on the left.

Great Hiwassee (Ayouwasi) – located in present-day Polk County, along the Hiwassee River at the base of the Unicoi Mountains, where the river levels into a fertile plain. The site has been developed as farmland. The term Hiwassee means "savanna" or "plain." Hiwassee is sometimes called "Hiwassee Old Town." 35.24314°N 84.58149°W

=== Trails and paths ===
The Overhill settlements were connected by a series of well-established Native American trails:

- The Great Indian Warpath ran parallel to the base of the Appalachians, connecting the Overhill settlements to Cherokee villages in Georgia and Virginia.
- The Trading Path (later called the Unicoi Turnpike) connected the Overhill towns with the Middle settlements in North Carolina, the Lower towns in South Carolina, and extended to Charleston, South Carolina.
- The Warriors' Path connected Hiwassee Old Town, Great Tellico, and Chota.
- A branch of the Tuckaleechee and Southeastern Trail connected the Overhill towns along the Upper Little Tennessee with the Kitawha towns in North Carolina via Tuckaleechee Cove, Cades Cove and Ekaneetlee Gap (near Gregory Bald).
- The War Trace ran from the Upper Cherokee area, through southeast Kentucky, along Mason's Creek or Mace's Creek, and present-day Viper, Kentucky, passing through the Overhill towns and reaching the Georgia Cherokee towns. It also had connections to the Warrior's Path and the Cumberland Gap, Tennessee, area, and the Cherokee villages of Sullen Possum and Wildcat.

== History ==
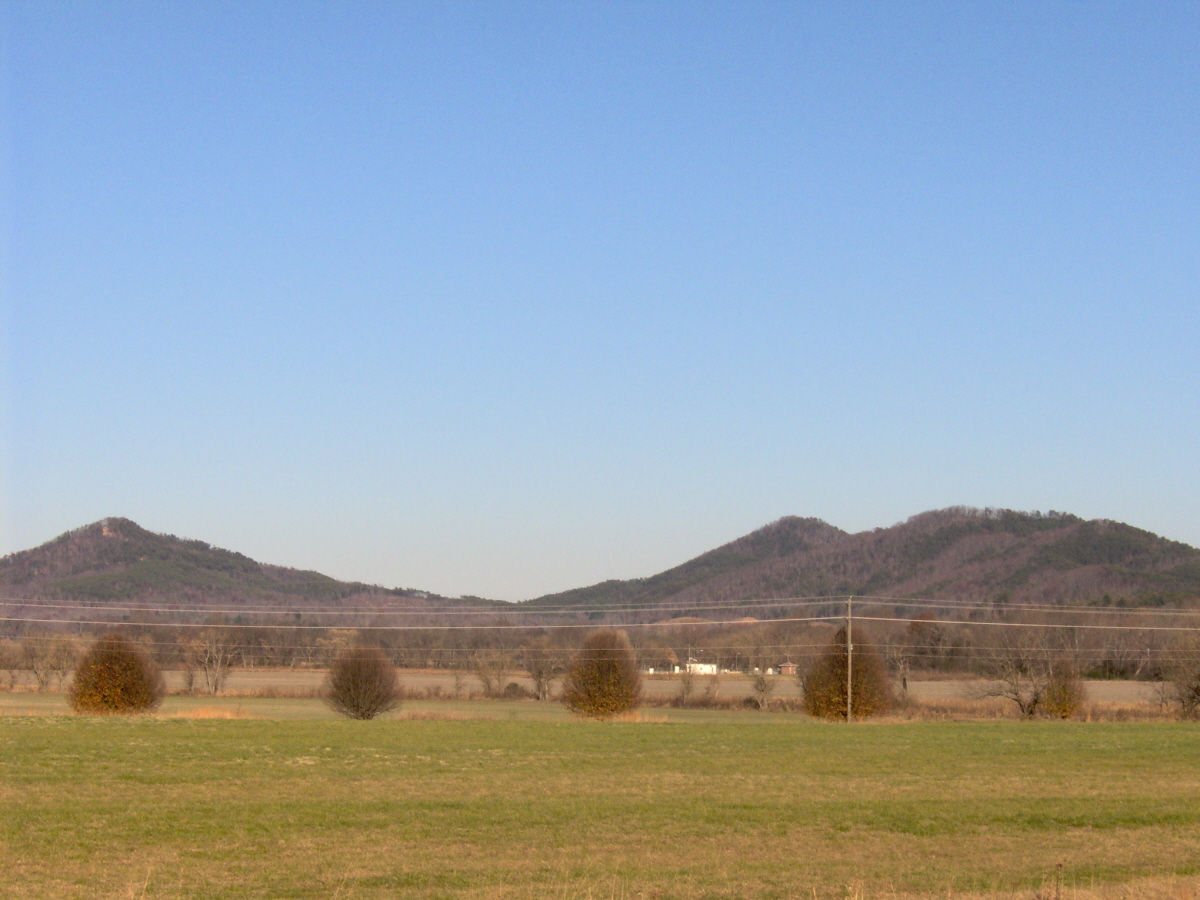
The site of Great Tellico in Tellico Plains, Tennessee

Early Euro-American explorers in Southern Appalachia noted that the Cherokee were concentrated around three general regions. The "Lower Towns" were centered on the town of Keowee in the hills of South Carolina and northeastern Georgia. The "Middle Towns" were centered on Nequassee and Tassetchee amidst the Great Balsam Mountains and eastern Unicoi Mountains in western North Carolina. The Overhill Cherokee lived in settlements located between the Appalachian Mountains and the Tennessee Valley in what is now Tennessee. The Overhill capital, or "mother town," shifted between Great Tellico, Tanasi, and Chota.

The Overhill settlements were established sometime between the late 16th century and the late 17th century, although scholars disagree on a more exact timeframe. The major towns were well-settled by the time the first Euro-American explorers arrived in the late 17th century. The Overhill Cherokee were recognized as speaking a dialect distinctive from that found in the Middle and Lower towns, although all the people identified as Cherokee.

=== Early accounts ===
For most of the 17th century, the British colonies on the Atlantic coast dealt with the Cherokee via representatives of other tribes acting as middlemen. As the fur trade expanded in importance with rising demand in European markets, traders and trappers went to the Overhill settlements for direct contact with the Cherokee and other western tribes. In 1673, Virginia merchants sent agents James Needham and Gabriel Arthur on a trip west of the Appalachians, hoping to open a direct trade route. While Needham was killed on the return trip, Arthur stayed behind. He later claimed to have accompanied the Native people (possibly the Cherokee) on raids of Spanish settlements in Florida.

In 1725, South Carolina sent Col. George Chicken on a diplomatic mission to the Overhill towns to address the issue of unlicensed traders, who were underselling merchants conducting business legally. Chicken arrived in Great Tellico in July. He described the village as "compact and thick settled;" the town and tribe had long competed in the region with the Creek tribe. Chicken followed the Warriors' Path north to the Little Tennessee River, where he met the "Head Warrior" of Tanasi and the chiefs of Citico and Tallassee.

=== Alexander Cuming ===
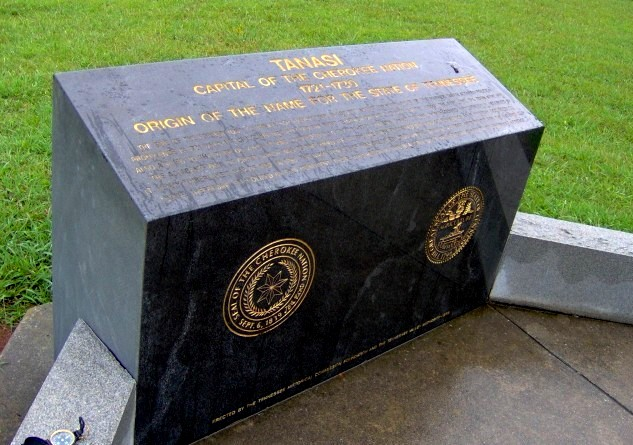
Tanasi monument on the shoreline above the now-submerged site of Tanasi.

Sir Alexander Cuming arrived in Charleston, South Carolina, in December 1729. Although he lacked official diplomatic credentials, Cuming managed to convince several Charlestonians that he was an agent of King George II of Great Britain on a mission to gain the loyalty of the Cherokee. Cuming set out for the Overhill town of Tanasi in March 1730, his stated goal being to gain the fabled "Crown of Tannassy."

Cuming moved quickly along the Trading Path, interacting briefly with Lower and Middle chiefs. In just under a month, Cuming had crossed the Unicoi Mountains into the Overhill country, a dangerous place at the time because of the Cherokees' ongoing war with the Creeks.

Years later, colonial trader Ludovick Grant, who lived in Great Tellico and briefly accompanied Cuming during his tour, described Cuming's techniques. In each town, Cuming arranged a meeting with local Cherokee leaders. He arrived fully armed at the meeting at the town council house, in defiance of custom. There he made a prepared speech saying that he was a private citizen wishing only to see their country, and that if any Indians wished to return to England with him, he would take them. He asked them to join his party in a toast to the health of King George II, and to kneel in allegiance. He told his guides that he would have set fire to the townhouse and killed the assembled Indians if they refused.

During his stay in Great Tellico, Cuming was impressed by the display of its chief Moytoy. He described the encounter in his journal (referring to his party in third person):

They arrived at great Telliquo in the Afternoon, saw the petrifying Cave, a great many Enemies Scalps brought in and put upon Poles at the Warriors Doors, made a Friend of the great Moytoy, and Jacob the Conjurer.

Cuming learned that Moytoy was trying to gain control of the entire Cherokee people, who were highly decentralized, with power associated with regional settlements. Cuming agreed to help Moytoy if the chief would help him get the Crown of Tanasi. On March 30, 1730, Cuming followed the Warriors' Path from Great Tellico to Tanasi, which he found "pleasantly situated" along the Little Tennessee. Cuming met with the Tanasi Warrior, whom he understood to be the de facto leader of the Overhill at the time. After gaining the Tanasi Warrior's allegiance, Cuming returned to Great Tellico. He accompanied Moytoy back across the Unicoi Mountains to Nequassee, and helped the chief be crowned as "Emperor of the Cherokee."

Cuming returned to England on June 5, 1730, accompanied by several Cherokee and carrying an opossum-hair headdress, which he referred to as the "Crown of Tannassy." Although he had planned to present the party and crown to King George II, a delegation from Charleston arrived claiming Cuming had defrauded them. While Cuming's schemes led to his own downfall, his visit to the Overhill towns helped to solidify an alliance between the Cherokee and the English.

=== Christian Priber ===
Around 1736, Christian Priber, a German utopian idealist, reached Great Tellico. Although initially working as a French agent, Priber quickly abandoned his mission. He adopted Cherokee customs, learned the language, and quickly gained the tribe's trust.

Priber attempted to organize Cherokee society in accordance with early 18th-century European idealism. He promoted the idea that all things should be held in common, including wives and children. Claiming the English were fraudulent and greedy, he suggested moving the Cherokee capital to modern-day Alabama, where it would be closer to the French colonial territory of La Louisiane. The English tried to arrest Priber in 1739 but were prevented by the Cherokee. He was finally captured by the Creek people in 1743 and turned over to South Carolina authorities.

=== Fort Loudoun ===
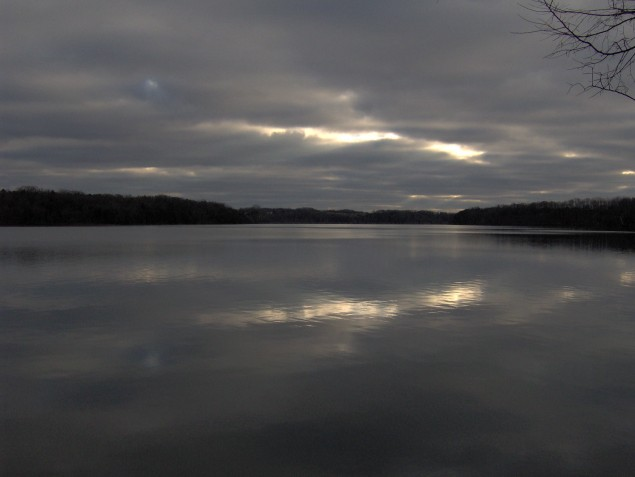
The now-submerged site of Tuskegee at Fort Loudoun State Park.

At the outbreak of the French and Indian War, the Cherokee aligned with the British. The Overhill towns agreed to provide military support, but asked that a fort be built to protect the area's women and children while the warriors were away. In 1756, the colonies dispatched Captain Raymond Demeré and engineer John DeBrahm to the area with several wagon loads of supplies for the construction of a fort along the Little Tennessee River. The fort, named after John Campbell, 4th Earl of Loudoun, stood at the junction of the Little Tennessee and the Tellico rivers. The Cherokee village of Tuskegee developed in its vicinity.

Shortly after the fort's construction, relations between the English and the Cherokee soured. Several Cherokee returning home from battle were killed by settlers, and an increase in horse thefts created tension in Virginia. After a contingent of Cherokee chiefs were detained at Fort Prince George in late 1759, the Cherokee, under Chief Standing Turkey, laid siege to Fort Loudoun. The fort's garrison held out until August 1760, when a lack of provisions forced them to surrender.

=== Timberlake Expedition ===
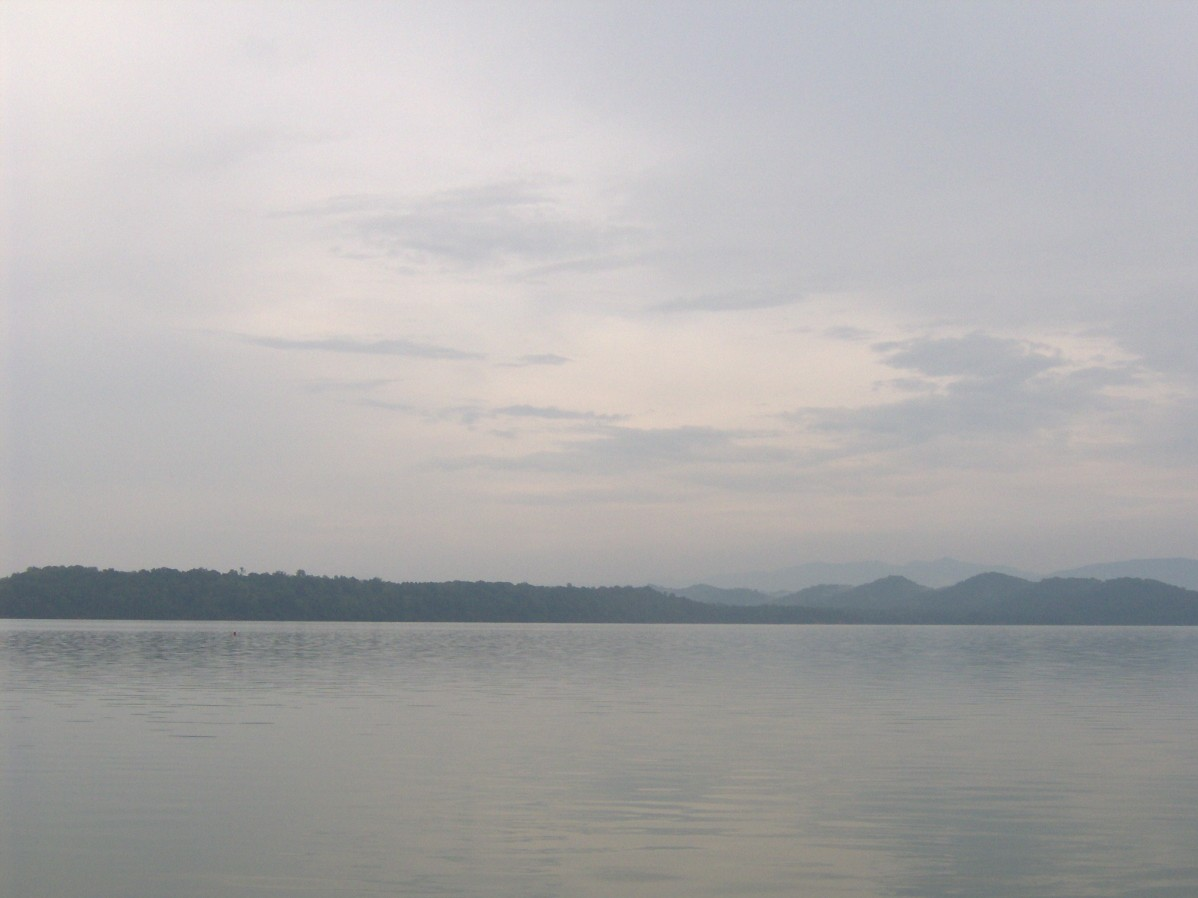
The now-submerged site of Tomotley and Toqua in Monroe County, Tennessee

The British colonies responded swiftly to the fall of Fort Loudoun. South Carolina sent Colonel James Grant against the Lower Towns; Virginia dispatched Colonel William Byrd to attack the Middle Towns in western North Carolina; and Colonel Adam Stephen detached from Byrd's regiment and marched to Long Island on the Holston (near modern-day Kingsport, Tennessee) with plans to attack the Overhill Towns. The Cherokee immediately sued for peace, which was granted. To help solidify the peace, Colonel Stephen dispatched Lieutenant Henry Timberlake and Sergeant Thomas Sumter to accompany a Cherokee delegation on a tour of the Overhill towns.

After a five-day journey down the Holston, French Broad, and Little Tennessee rivers, Timberlake arrived in the Overhill town of Tomotley. There he was greeted by Ostenaco and witnessed a ceremonial return of a Cherokee war party. After smoking a peace pipe with Ostenaco, Timberlake proceeded southward to Chota, where he was met by some 400 Cherokee. Timberlake smoked a peace pipe with several tribal leaders and recorded the layout and design of the town's large council-house.

The following day, Timberlake arrived in the town of Citico, where the residents greeted him with a long dance. After smoking a peace pipe with the town leader Cheulah, Timberlake proceeded southward to Chilhowee, where he gained similar assurances of peace. He returned via the trail to Long Island on the Holston. Timberlake's journals, published in the 1760s, contain detailed descriptions of Cherokee council-houses, residences, canoes, and other facets of everyday Cherokee life; these were invaluable to historians.

=== American Revolution ===
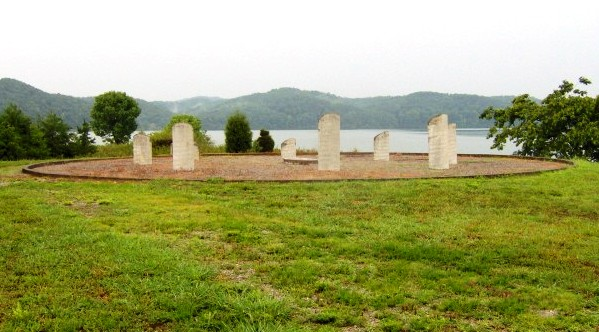
Monument marking the site of the Cherokee village of Chota in Monroe County, Tennessee

At the close of the Seven Years' War, Euro-American settlers began trickling into east Tennessee from the eastern colonies. In 1772, several pioneers negotiated a lease for Cherokee lands in northeast Tennessee and formed the Watauga Settlement. In spite of the agreement, tensions between the pioneers and the Cherokee rose steadily. By the outbreak of the American Revolution, the Cherokee were allied with the British against the rebellious American colonies, hoping to push the encroaching settlers out of their territory.

In 1776, the Cherokee initiated a plan to drive the settlers out of the Washington District, North Carolina, and invade Virginia. Virginia merchant Isaac Thomas— later a co-founder of Sevierville— was warned of the invasion by Nancy Ward, a Cherokee Beloved Woman and diplomat. Thomas passed on the warning to the settlers, who prepared their defenses. The first prong of the attack, led by Dragging Canoe, was defeated by colonists at Heaton's Station. The second and third prongs, led by Abraham of Chilhowee and The Raven, were routed at Fort Watauga and Carter's Valley.

In response to these attacks, several thousand militia members in two groups led by William Christian and General Griffith Rutherford invaded the Overhill towns and burned Tuskegee and Citico. The major faction of the Cherokee made peace shortly thereafter, under the Treaty of De Witt's Corner.

In 1780, while the North Carolina militia from the Washington District, often referred to as the "overhill militia", were away at the Battle of Kings Mountain, the Cherokee launched sporadic raids against the settlers there. Upon his return, Colonel John Sevier, who had gained fame as a co-commander at Kings Mountain, was dispatched, along with several thousand militia, to the south on a punitive expedition to the Overhill towns. After defeating the Cherokee in a fierce battle at Boyd's Creek (in modern-day Sevier County), Sevier proceeded southward. He destroyed most of the remaining, lightly defended villages, including the chief city of Chota.

=== Cherokee–American wars ===
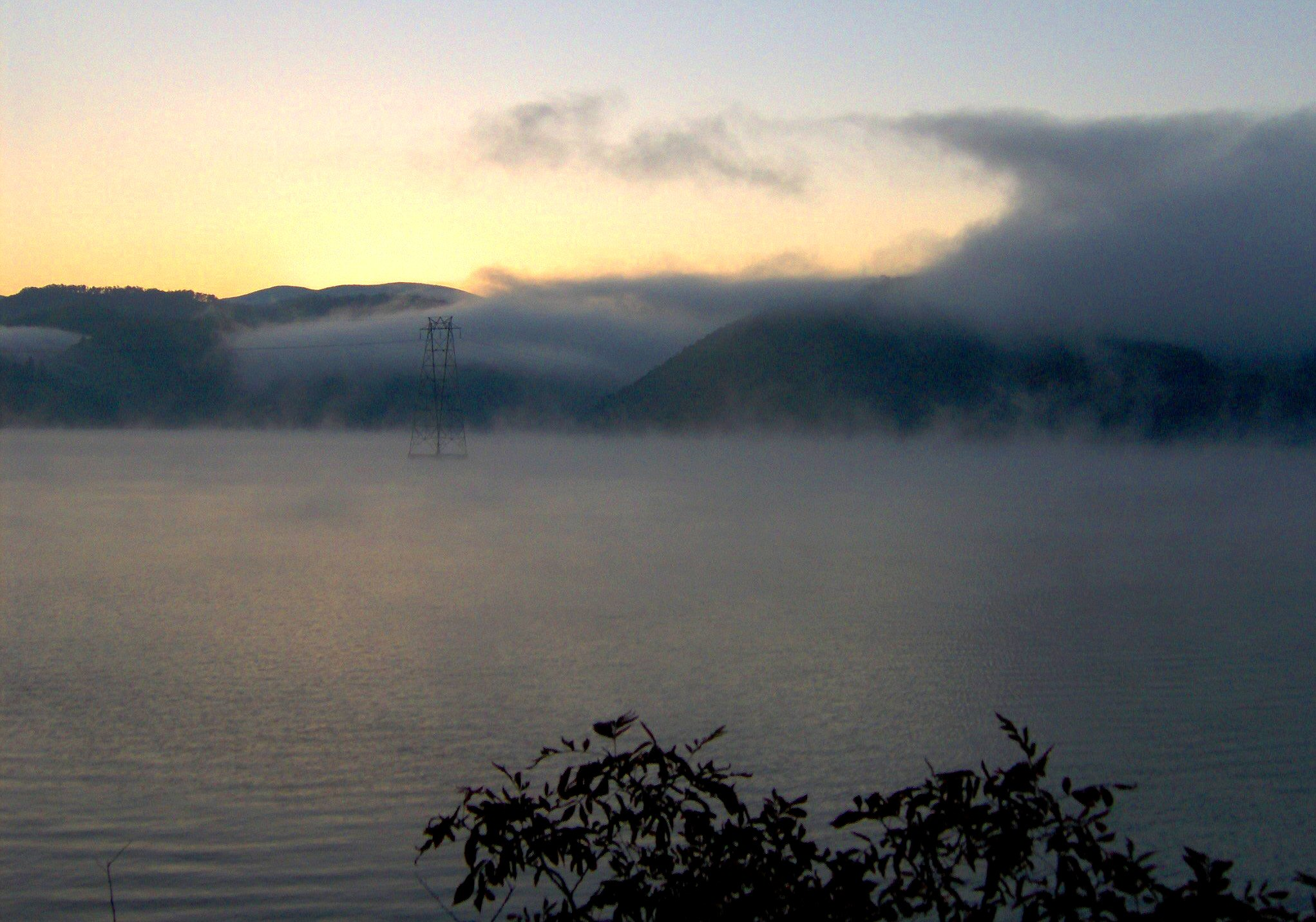
The ancient site of Chilhowee is now under Chilhowee Lake, near the junction of US-129 and Foothills Parkway.

After the Cherokee defeats at Heaton's Station and Fort Watauga in 1776, most Cherokee chiefs, including Attakullakulla and Oconastota, signed the Treaty of De Witt's Corner. Dragging Canoe and Ostenaco refused to recognize this treaty, claiming the settlers were unlikely to abide by the treaty's terms. Along with several renegade tribesmen from across the Cherokee tribes, they moved south to Chickamauga Creek, in the vicinity of what is now Chattanooga, and set up a series of villages.

Settlers called them the "Chickamauga Cherokee" after their location and to distinguish them from the greater Cherokee tribe. The Chickamauga (or "Lower Cherokee" as they were also sometimes called) proceeded to carry on an unconventional war against the encroaching Euro-American settlers, ambushing small patrols and attacking small settlements. After Oconastota's death in the early 1780s, Chief Old Tassel was recognized as the leader of the Overhill Cherokee. He sought more distance from the Chickamauga. After an expedition by Sevier destroyed the Chickamauga towns in 1782, Dragging Canoe moved the Chickamaugas southwest to modern-day Marion County, Tennessee, where he continued his struggle.

=== Tellico Agency ===
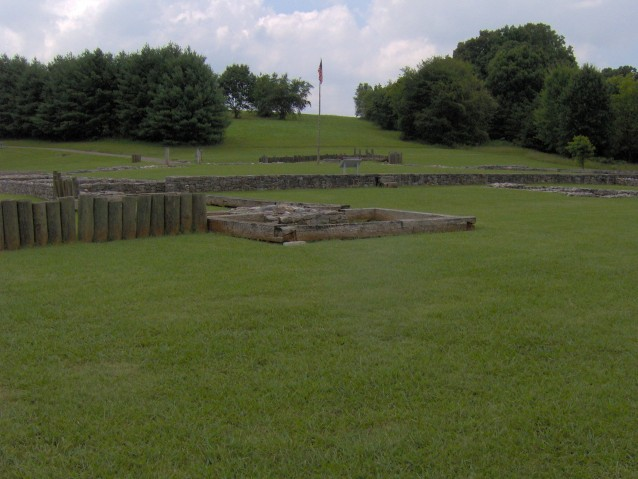
The Tellico Blockhouse site, with posts and stone fill showing the original layout.

After the assassination of Old Tassel in 1788, Chief Hanging Maw was recognized as the leader of the Overhill towns. With violence spiraling out of control, Hanging Maw petitioned territorial Governor William Blount for a fort to protect the peaceful Overhill villages from vengeful settlers. In 1794, Hanging Maw donated land at the junction of Nine Mile Creek and the Little Tennessee River to the U.S. government for the construction of the Tellico Blockhouse.

Along with a small garrison of federal soldiers, the Tellico Blockhouse was the headquarters of the Tellico Agent, William Blount, the official liaison between the U.S. and the Cherokee. On November 8, 1794, Blount met Hanging Maw (representing the Overhill Cherokee) and John Watt (representing the Lower Cherokee) to sign a treaty ending the Cherokee–American wars. Over the next ten years, the U.S. made several other treaties with the Cherokee, persuading Cherokee leaders to cede large portions of land in East and Middle Tennessee, including the Overhill towns along the Little Tennessee, in an attempt to gain peace. With the cession of Overhill lands, the Cherokee Nation's center of power shifted south to New Echota in Georgia. Settlers migrating throughout the Southeast kept up pressure to gain Cherokee lands.

== Overhill sites today ==
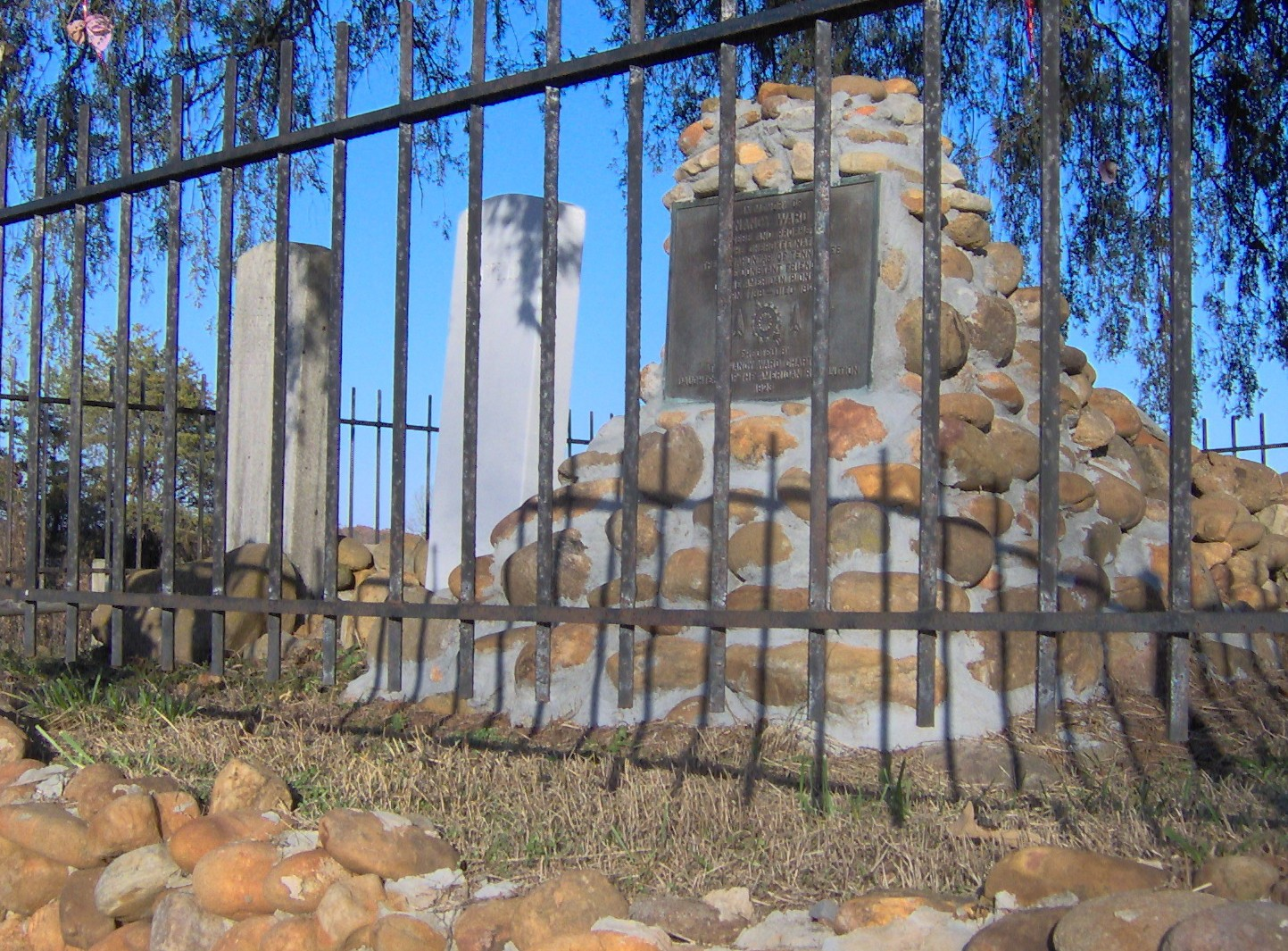
Grave site of Cherokee Nancy Ward showing her memorial (right). The other markers are for her son Fivekiller, and her brother Longfellow. The site is situated on a small hill overlooking the Ocoee River near Benton, Tennessee

In 1967, the Tennessee Valley Authority began construction on Tellico Dam just above the mouth of the Little Tennessee. The impoundment created Tellico Lake and effectively flooded all of the original known Overhill sites along the Little Tennessee River. Before the flooding, the University of Tennessee conducted extensive archaeological excavations, identifying Chota's townhouse and the grave of Oconastota. The site of Chota's townhouse was covered with fill, raising it above water levels. A monument with eight pillars— one for the Cherokee Nation and each of its seven clans— was placed at the site along with the reinterred grave of Oconastota. Nearby, a small monument was erected marking the site of Tanasi and recalling it as the root of the state's name. Both sites are managed by the Eastern Band of the Cherokee.

Further upstream, Chilhowee Dam was named after the now-submerged site of Chilhowee. Tennessee Reservoir Development Agency (TRDA) boat ramps have been named after the submerged former sites of Toqua and Tallassee. Abrams Creek, which traverses Cades Cove and empties into the Little Tennessee, is named after chief Abraham of Chilhowee.

In the 20th century, Fort Loudoun was reconstructed by state teams, as well as a replica of a 17th-century village dwelling of Tuskegee; these are located within the Fort Loudoun State Park. The state park also manages the Tellico Blockhouse site, the foundations of which have been identified and marked. The Sequoyah Birthplace Museum, near Fort Loudoun in Vonore, is dedicated to the creator of the Cherokee alphabet. The Unicoi Trail, a cross-country hiking trail, now connects the Sequoyah Museum with Murphy, North Carolina, roughly following the ancient Trading Path. The Frank H. McClung Museum at the University of Tennessee contains hundreds of Cherokee artifacts obtained from various excavations which the university has conducted in the Tennessee Valley over the past century.

== Prominent Overhill Cherokee figures ==
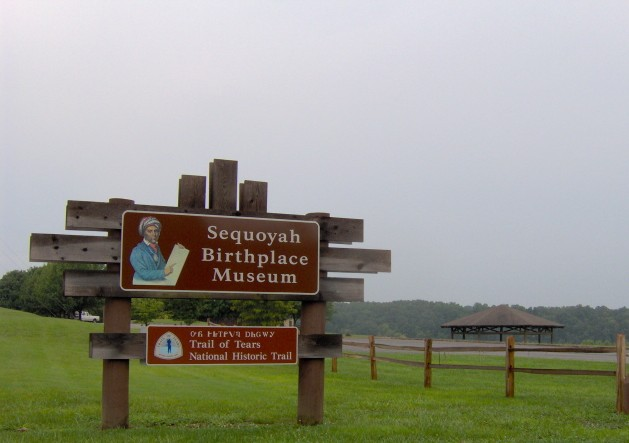
Sequoyah Birthplace Museum in Vonore

- Moytoy of Tellico (c. 1687–1760) – headman at Great Tellico at the time of Cuming's visit
- Old Tassel (Onitositaii) (c. 1700–1788) — headman of Toqua, First Beloved Man of the Cherokee
- Ostenaco (c. 1700–1780) – head chief of Tomotley, at the time of Timberlake's visit
- Attakullakulla (c.1710–1777) – born in Chota; father of Dragging Canoe
- Oconostota (c. 1710–1783) – born and died in Chota
- Jacob the Conjurer (fl. ca. 1730) – in Great Tellico at the time of Cumming's visit
- Dragging Canoe (c. 1738–1792) – born in Chota, onetime headman of Great Island Town
- Nancy Ward (c. 1738–1824) – born in Chota
- John Watts (1753–1802) – nephew of Old Tassel, leader of the Chickamauga/Lower Cherokee after Dragging Canoe died in 1792.
- Moytoy of Citico (1759–1761) - began the Anglo-Cherokee War
- Sequoyah (c. 1767–1843) – born in Tuskegee
- Savanukah (The Raven); participated in the 1776 offensive into the Washington District, North Carolina, served as headman of the Overhill Cherokee, 1780–1781.
- Abraham of Chilhowee (or Abram) (d. 1788) – led Cherokee assault against Fort Watauga in 1776

== See also ==
- Overmountain Men
- Southwest Territory
- Trans-Appalachia
