= Conocotocko =

Conocotocko is the English rendering of ᎬᎾᎦᏙᎦ (Gvnagadoga), Cherokee for "Standing Turkey". It may refer to:

- Conocotocko I (also called "Old Hop"), Cherokee chief 1753–1760
- Conocotocko II (also called "Standing Turkey"), Cherokee chief beginning 1760
