= Chilhowee (Cherokee town) =

Cherokee village site in Tennessee, US

Coordinates: 35.55231°N 84.00737°W

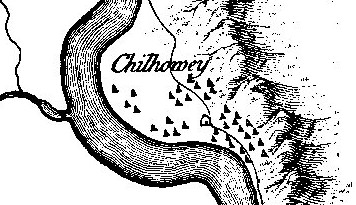
Chilhowee on Henry Timberlake's 1762 Draught of the Cherokee Country

Chilhowee (Cherokee: ᏧᎷᎾᏪ, romanized: Tsulunawe) was a prehistoric and historic Native American site in present-day Blount and Monroe counties in Tennessee, in what were the Southeastern Woodlands. Although now submerged by the Chilhowee Lake impoundment of the Little Tennessee River, the Chilhowee site was home to a substantial 18th-century Overhill Cherokee town. It may have been the site of the older Creek village "Chalahume" visited by Spanish explorer Juan Pardo in 1567. The Cherokee later pushed the Muscogee Creek out of this area.

Although Chilhowee was destroyed by Euro-American frontiersmen who fought the Cherokee in the late 18th century, the village's name is still used for various entities throughout East Tennessee. Along with Chilhowee Dam and its reservoir, places and entities named after Chilhowee include a mountain, a geologic formation, several churches and schools, and a park and neighborhood in Knoxville.

== Geography ==
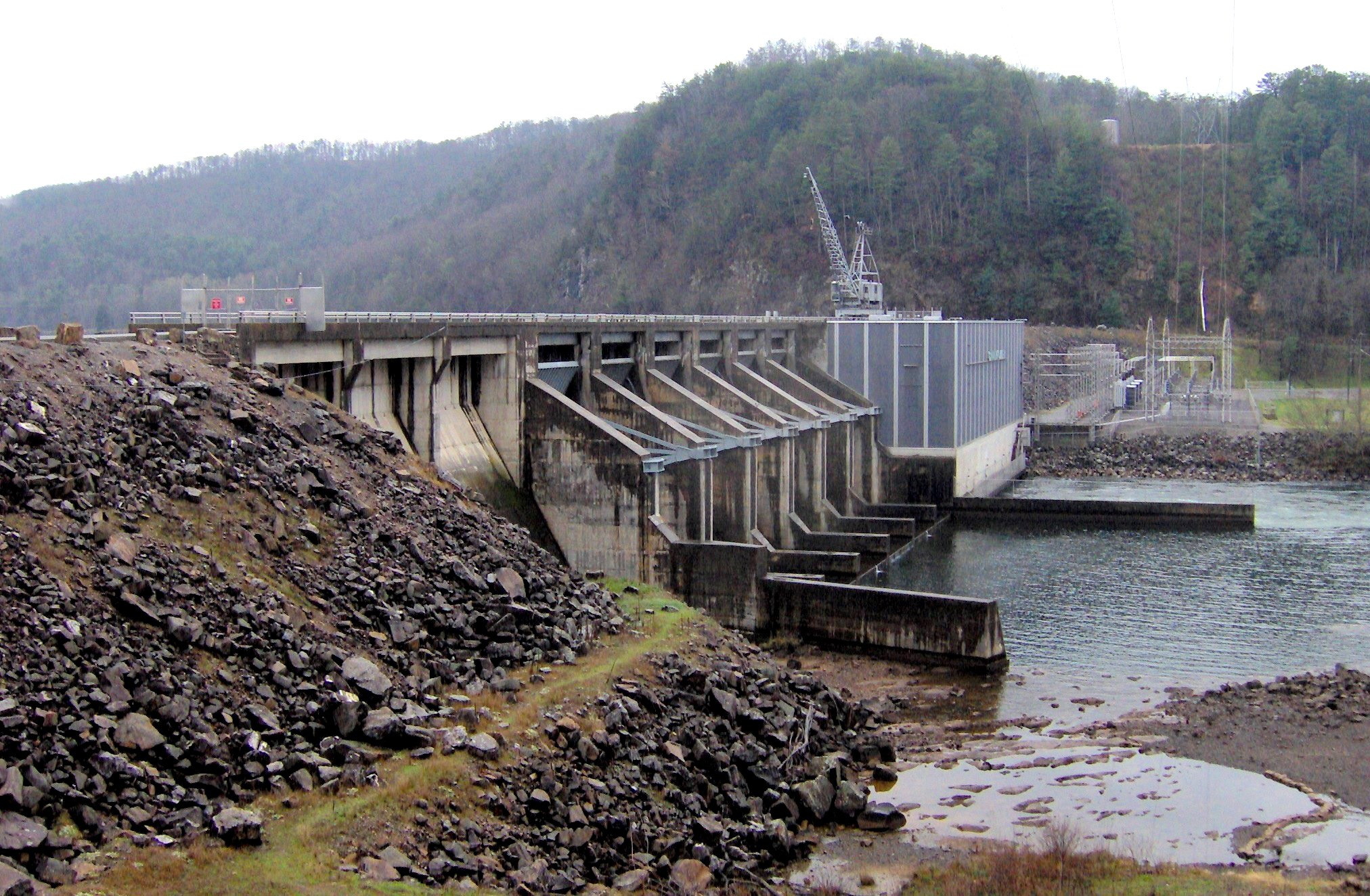
Chilhowee Dam

The Little Tennessee River enters Tennessee from the south and flows northwestward for roughly 54 miles (87 km) through parts of Blount, Monroe, and Loudon counties before emptying into the Tennessee River near present-day Lenoir City. Chilhowee Dam, completed in 1957 by the Aluminum Company of America's Tapoco Division, is situated approximately 34 miles (55 km) above the mouth of the Little Tennessee. The dam created Chilhowee Lake, a reservoir stretching for roughly 10 miles (16 km) between Chilhowee Dam and Calderwood Dam, near the Tennessee-North Carolina border. Before inundation, the Chilhowee site was located along a bend in the Little Tennessee opposite the river's Abrams Creek confluence, approximately 36 miles (58 km) above river's mouth. The site is visible immediately southeast of the junction of U.S. Route 129 and Foothills Parkway.

The Chilhowee site is situated in an area where the Appalachian Mountains— namely, the Great Smoky Mountains to the northeast and the Unicoi Mountains to the south— give way to the rolling hills of the Appalachian Ridge-and-Valley Province. Chilhowee Lake provides part of the boundary between the Great Smoky Mountains National Park and the Cherokee National Forest.

== History ==
=== Chalahume ===
According to anthropologist Charles Hudson, the Juan Pardo expedition entered the upper Tennessee Valley (then occupied by part of the Chiaha chiefdom) in late 1567 via the Pigeon River. Pardo followed this to its confluence with the French Broad River near modern Newport. The expedition rested for several days at the Chiaha capital of Olamico.

Based on the chronicles of the Pardo expedition, which were not translated into English until the late 20th century, Hudson believes Olamico was located on Zimmerman's Island (now submerged by Douglas Lake). On October 13, Pardo left Olamico, traveling southwest across the foothills of the Great Smoky Mountains en route to the Coosa chiefdom in northern Georgia. The expedition crossed Little River near modern Walland and traversed Happy Valley to reach Chalahume in the Little Tennessee Valley on October 15. Expedition notary Juan de la Bandera described Chalahume's topographic situation as similar to the Spanish city of Córdoba—a grapevine-filled valley at the base of high mountains—a description that fits Chilhowee.

Hudson points out that the phoneme "/m/" is infrequent in the Cherokee language. When the Cherokee replaced Chalahume's Mississippian-era occupants, they retained the site's name but substituted a "w" for the "m". A similar situation occurred 5 miles (8.0 km) downstream from Chilhowee in the renaming of Citico. Hudson argues that this was the Satapo settlement visited by the Pardo expedition on October 16.

=== Cherokee period ===
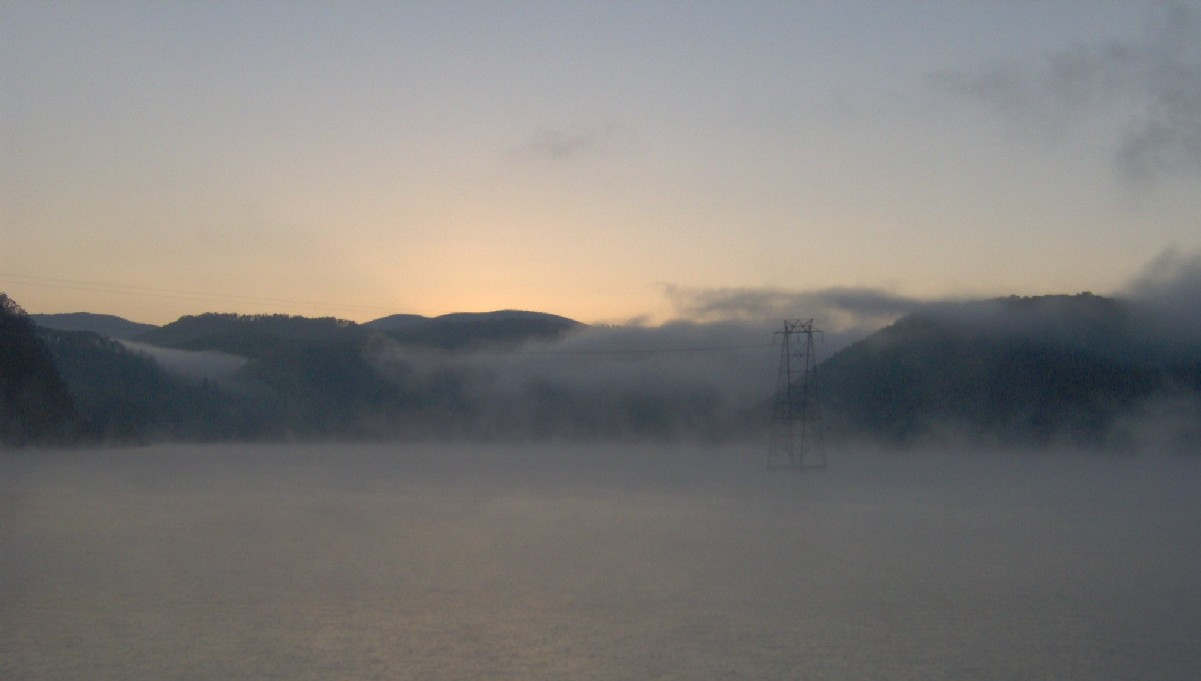
The now-submerged ancient site of Chilhowee

Late 19th-century anthropologist James Mooney recorded two Cherokee legends regarding Chilhowee. The first was the story of the Utlunta, an ogress who roamed the Chilhowee area and devoured children, before the Cherokee cornered and killed her on the slopes of Chilhowee Mountain. Another legend concerned the "False Warriors of Chilhowee," a band of warriors who attacked a force from an allied city. They returned to Chilhowee claiming they had heroically killed several of the town's enemies. Mooney believed the word Chilhowee was rooted in the Cherokee word for "kingfisher." Hudson rejected this, saying that Chilhowee is the Cherokee pronunciation (transliteration) of the Muskogean name Chalahume, as Cherokee has no "m" sound.

Chilhowee was not recorded among the Overhill Towns until the mid-18th century, but its neighbors Citico and Tallassee were documented in the earliest English records of the region. Colonel George Chicken visited the Overhill towns in 1725 in an effort to create an alliance against the Creek (Muscogee). He recorded meeting with the head men of Tanasi, Citico, Tallassee, Great Tellico, and "Coosaw" at the Tanasi townhouse.

George Hunter's map of the Overhill country shows Tallassee, Citico, Tanasi, and Great Tellico, but does not note Chilhowee. But Henry Timberlake recorded visiting Chilhowee on a peace mission in 1761, and he engaged in a pipe-smoking ceremony with the town's head men. Timberlake's map, Draught of the Cherokee Country (1762), published with his memoir, shows 18 dwellings and a townhouse at Chilhowee; he listed Yachtino as the town's headman and noted 110 warriors residing there. Based on the data he recorded for the several Overhill towns on the map, these warriors were the third-largest fighting contingent, behind only Citico and Chota.

The encroachment of Euro-American settlers into the Tennessee Valley in the 1770s led to increased conflict with the valley's Cherokee inhabitants. Around this time, Old Abraham (or "Abram"), the headman of Chilhowee, had risen to prominence among the Overhill Cherokee. When the Cherokee aligned themselves with the British at the outbreak of the American Revolution in 1776, Old Abraham, The Raven, and Dragging Canoe (the head man at Mialoquo) led a three-pronged attack against the rebel encampments at Fort Watauga, Carter's Valley, and Heaton's station, respectively. The expedition was a disaster for the Native Americans.

Virginia dispatched Colonel William Christian with a small force to subdue the Overhill towns. Christian entered the Little Tennessee Valley unopposed and made a truce with several older chiefs, but when Dragging Canoe refused to accept a peace offering, Christian burned several Overhill towns, including Chilhowee.

In 1788, Old Abraham and several other chiefs were tomahawked to death under a flag of truce by a son of John Kirk, a settler whose family had been massacred by members of the Cherokee militant factions on Nine Mile Creek.

=== 19th and 20th centuries ===
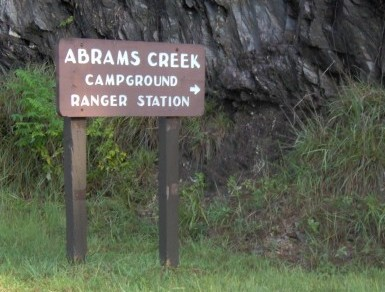
Sign pointing the way to Abrams Creek Campground

Around 1850, brothers William and Robert James established a cotton and woolen mill at the mouth of Abrams Creek. The mill used power generated by the creek to spin and weave fabric. The mill closed at the outset of the American Civil War.

The Cherokee National Forest, established in 1911, now protects the western shoreline above Chilhowee Lake. The Great Smoky Mountains National Park, established in 1932, protects the eastern shoreline. Abrams Creek, the longest stream located entirely within the park, is named for Old Abraham of Chilhowee. A campground and ranger station is located along the creek a few miles upstream from Chilhowee.

When Alcoa announced plans to build Chilhowee Dam in 1955, the Knoxville Chapter of the Tennessee Archaeological Society arranged to conduct salvage excavations at the Chilhowee site and the Tallassee site (near modern Calderwood), both of which would be flooded by the dam's reservoir. Because of the greater amount of surface material at Tallassee and the Tallassee site's accessibility, the Knoxville Chapter decided to focus on Tallassee and conducted only limited surface collections at Chilhowee.
