= Timberlake Expedition =

1761 peace mission into the Overhill Cherokee lands

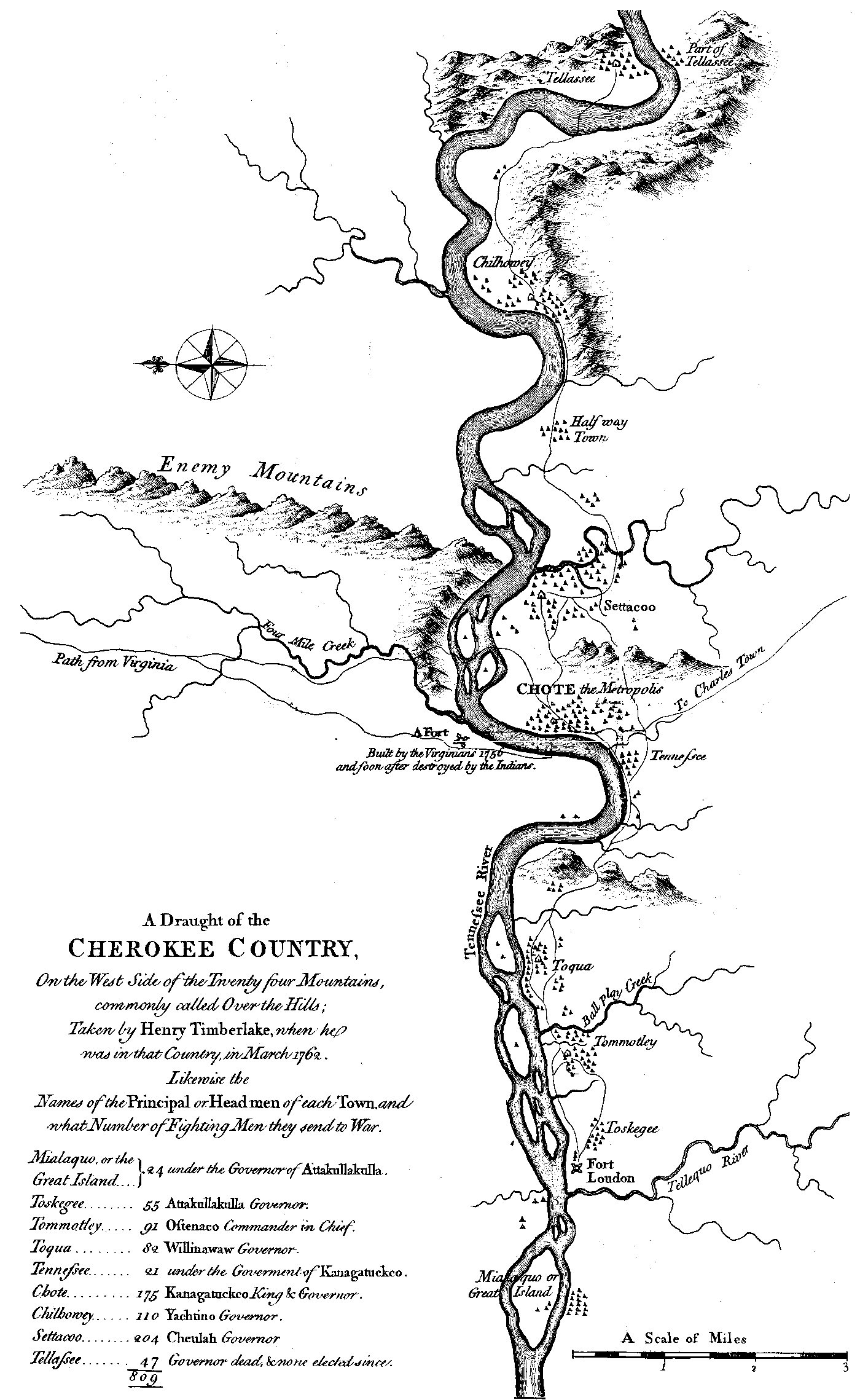
Timberlake's "Draught of the Cherokee Country"

The Timberlake Expedition was an excursion into the Overhill Cherokee lands west of the Appalachian Mountains, which took place in 1761 following the Anglo-Cherokee War. Its purpose was to renew and solidify friendship between colonial Americans and the Cherokee following the three-year war. The endeavor is named after the commander of the expedition, Henry Timberlake.

== Organization ==
The Timberlake Expedition was organized in 1761 by Colonel Adam Stephen. The expressed purpose of the expedition was to visit the Overhill Cherokee (in present-day Tennessee) to verify that an end of hostilities of the Anglo-Cherokee War had taken place in the Virginia back-country. Stephen gave command of the expedition to Henry Timberlake, who had volunteered for the assignment. Timberlake was accompanied by Sergeant Thomas Sumter (who funded the expedition), John McCormack (an interpreter), and a servant. The small group purchased a canoe and ten days' worth of provisions with money Sumter had borrowed. The planned route was to follow the Holston River to its confluence with the French Broad River, and proceed to the Little Tennessee River, where the five main Overhill towns were situated.

== Expedition ==
Timberlake's party left Long Island-on-the-Holston on November 28, 1761. The Holston River's unusually low water levels slowed their progress, as the party had to drag or portage the canoe over and around exposed shoals and sandbars. They ran out of provisions after several days, but McCormack managed to shoot a bear, supplying them with several days' worth of meat. Around December 7, the party explored a stalactite-filled cave situated approximately 50 feet (15 m) above the river. In his journal, Timberlake describes Sumter swimming nearly a half-mile in the icy waters to retrieve their canoe which had drifted away while they were exploring the cave.

On December 13, the party reached a series of river cascades which Timberlake called "Great Falls". The party spent a day maneuvering their way down the cascades but found the Holston frozen over immediately downstream. The ice slowed them more, but rains on the night of December 14 thawed the ice, and the party passed out of the mouth of the Holston (at modern-day Knoxville) into the Tennessee River on December 15.

=== Overhill country ===
Having traveled through the Appalachian Mountains to this point, the expedition traveled more quickly on the Tennessee River. A hunting party led by the Cherokee leader, Slave Catcher, met the party near the mouth of the Little Tennessee River and supplied the weary expedition with provisions of "dried venison, homminy, and boiled corn." The following day Slave Catcher guided the expedition up the Little Tennessee. The party struggled to keep up with the Cherokee, with Timberlake recalling, "my hands were so galled, that the blood trickled from them, and when we set out the next morning I was scarce able to handle a pole." They arrived in the Overhill village of Tomotley on December 20, where they were greeted by the town's head man, Ostenaco (or "Mankiller").

After spending several days in Tomotley as guests of Ostenaco, they proceeded to the Overhill mother-town of Chota, where several Cherokee town heads had gathered in the large council-house. Ostenaco gave a speech and ceremoniously buried a hatchet in the ground, symbolizing a state of peace between the English and the Cherokee. Timberlake smoked several pipes with the gathered town heads. He described it in his memoir as "very disagreeable," but respected the ritual with the chiefs.

The party continued southward to Citico, where Timberlake was greeted with a ceremonial dance involving some 400 Cherokee. Timberlake recalled that the dancers were "painted all over in a hideous manner" and that they "danced in a very uncommon figure." The town's head man, Cheulah, presented Timberlake with a string of beads and held another pipe-smoking ceremony. The non-stop pipe smoking made Timberlake so sick that he "could not stir for several hours." The following day, Timberlake and Ostenaco traveled to Chilhowee, the second southernmost of the Overhill towns on Timberlake's map, where the town's head man, Yachtino, held a peace procession similar to that held at Citico.

=== Return to Virginia ===
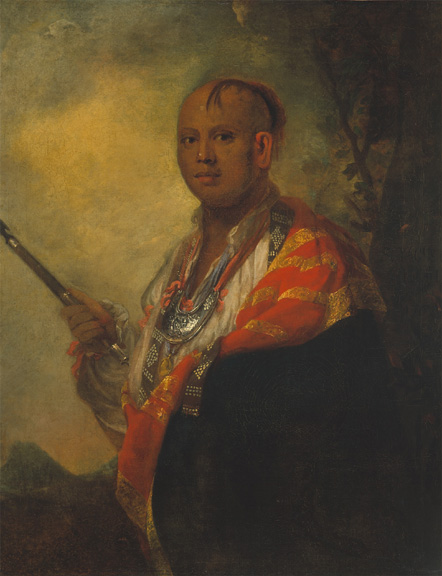
Portrait of Ostenaco; by Sir Joshua Reynolds; 1762

The assignment largely completed, the party returned to Tomotley with Ostenaco on January 2, 1762. Timberlake spent the next few weeks studying Cherokee habits, making notes, and mapping the Overhill country. At the end of January, rumors began trickling in from Cherokee scouts of renewed hostilities with rival tribes to the north. Although the rumors turned out to be based on a misunderstanding, Timberlake grew anxious and begged Ostenaco to guide him back to Virginia. Ostenaco reluctantly agreed, and the party set out on March 10, 1762. Just before departure, Timberlake witnessed the ceremonial return of a war party led by Willinawaw. The party sang "the war-song" and planted a scalp-filled pole next to the council-house door.

The Timberlake party had decided to make the return trip overland with purchased horses from the Cherokee. Ostenaco, accompanied by several hundred Cherokee warriors, guided the Timberlake group northward along what is now known as the Great Indian Warpath, which followed the western base of the Appalachian Mountains. On March 11, the party arrived at the abandoned Cherokee village of Elajoy along the Little River in what is now Maryville, Tennessee. They crossed the French Broad River the following day. A week later, they reached Fort Robinson, which the Stephen garrison had abandoned but where they left behind a large supply of flour. The expedition left Long Island-of-the-Holston on March 22, continuing northward to an abandoned army camp. There, Timberlake was disappointed to find that his belongings had been looted from a trunk. The party arrived in Williamsburg, Virginia, on the James River in early April.

=== Trip to London ===
While in Williamsburg, Timberlake and Ostenaco attended a dinner party at the College of William & Mary at which Ostenaco professed his desire to meet the king of England. Although he feared the trip would break him financially, Timberlake agreed. In May 1762, Timberlake, Sumter, and three distinguished Cherokee leaders, including Ostenaco, departed for London.

Arriving in early June, the Cherokee were an immediate attraction, drawing crowds all over the city. The poet Oliver Goldsmith waited for three hours to meet the Indians and offered a gift to Ostenaco. They sat for Sir Joshua Reynolds to paint their portraits, and they met personally with King George III. The Cherokee returned to North America with Sergeant Sumter in August. Timberlake remained behind in England.

== Aftermath ==
Upon returning to the colonies, Sumter became stranded in South Carolina due to financial difficulties. He petitioned the Virginia Colony for reimbursement of his travel expenses but was denied. He was subsequently imprisoned for debt in Virginia. When his friend and fellow soldier, Joseph Martin, arrived in Staunton, Martin asked to spend the night with Sumter in jail. He gave Sumter ten guineas and a tomahawk. Sumter used the money to buy his way out of jail in 1766. When Martin and Sumter were reunited some 30 years later, Sumter repaid the money.
