= Long Island (Tennessee) =

Island in Tennessee, United States

- Long Island of the Holston
- U.S. National Register of Historic Places
- U.S. National Historic Landmark District
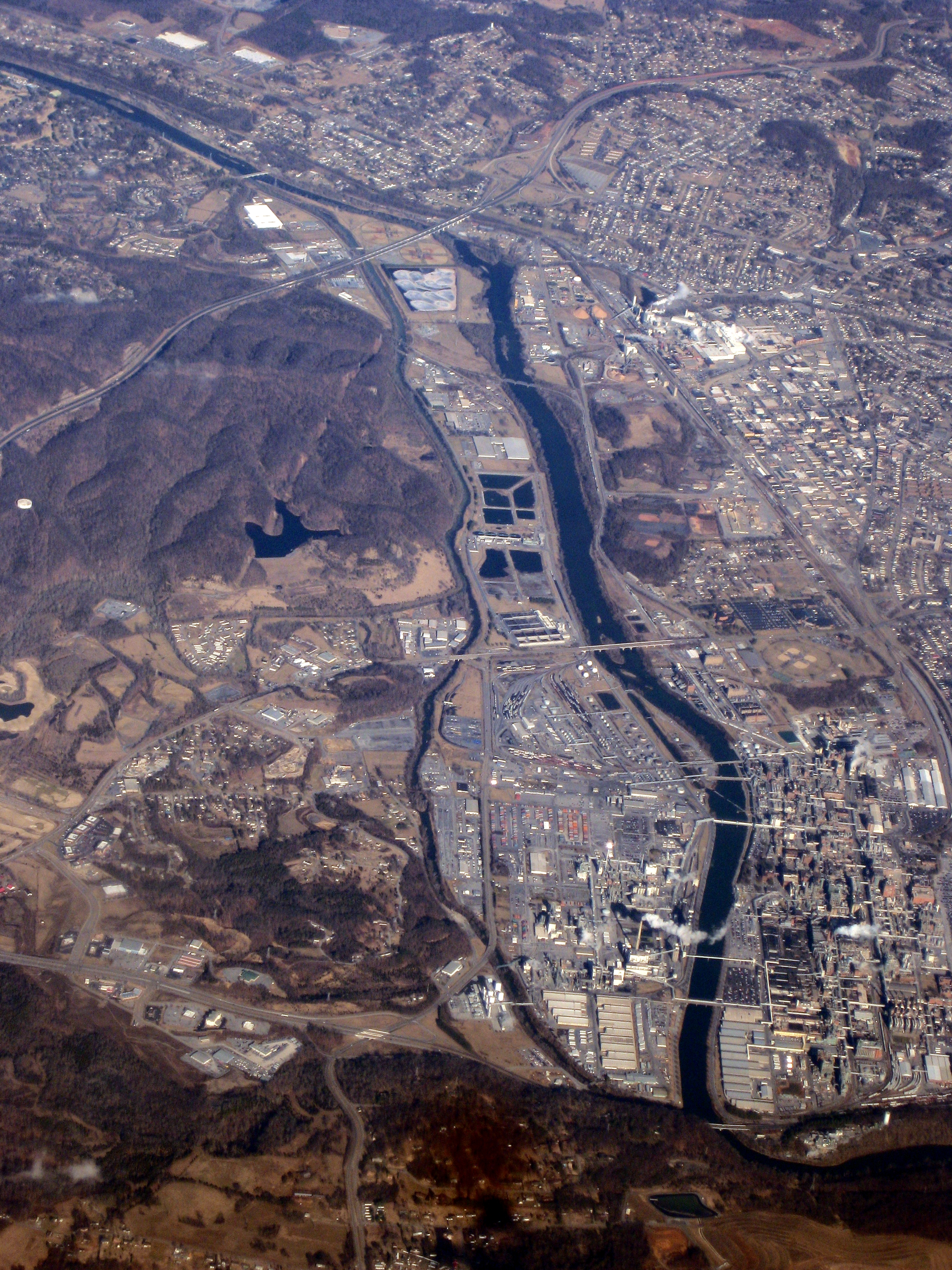
- Aerial view of the island

- Location within Tennessee Location within the United States
- Location: S. Branch Holston River, Kingsport, Tennessee
- Coordinates: 36°31′49″N 82°33′39″W
- Area: 840 acres (340 ha)
- Built: 1760
- NRHP reference No.: 66000733

Significant dates
- Added to NRHP: October 15, 1966
- Designated NHLD: October 9, 1960

Long Island (Cherokee: ᎠᎼᏰᎵ ᎫᎾᎯᏔ, romanized: Amoyeli Gunahita), also known as Long Island of the Holston, is an island in the Holston River at Kingsport in East Tennessee. Important in regional history since pre-colonial times, the island is listed on the National Register of Historic Places and is designated as a U.S. National Historic Landmark District.

== Geography ==
Long Island is located across the main channel of the South Branch Holston River from downtown Kingsport. It is about 4 miles (6.4 km) in length, and has a maximum width of about 0.5 miles (0.80 km). A secondary channel, known locally as the Sluice, forms the southern border of the island. Bridges carry Tennessee State Route 126 across both channels about 2/3 of the way south on the island, and a third bridge carries Jared Drive to the mainland near its southern tip. The area south of SR 126 is mostly occupied by Eastman Chemical.

== History ==
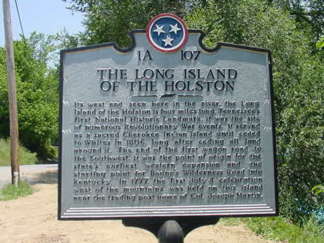
Historic plaque

The Long Island of the Holston River was an important site for the Cherokee and their ancestors, as this had been part of their homelands for thousands of years. Their territory extended into present-day western North and South Carolina, and northeast Georgia. It was a sacred council and treaty site among the Cherokee.

In addition, European colonial pioneers and early settlers of the region also used the island for its strategic location. The Timberlake Expedition of 1761–62 used it as its point of origin and return. Daniel Boone, in 1775, began from the Long Island to clear the Wilderness Road, which extended through the Cumberland Gap into Kentucky.

During the American Revolution, the Cherokee allied with the British, in the hope of expelling colonists from their territory. They defeated frontiersmen in July 1776. William Cocke, who had worked with Boone and led fights against the Cherokee, sold the island in 1776 to Samuel Woods but he did not have a right to do so.

European-American settlers built Fort Patrick Henry on the north bank of the South Fork of the Holston River. Colonel William Christian commanded 2,000 men in a punitive expedition against the Cherokee towns, suppressing their resistance. The 1777 Treaty of Long Island (Avery Treaty) stated that the Cherokee still owned the land of Long Island, but they relinquished all claims to other land occupied by whites in east Tennessee. That year Colonel Joseph Martin was appointed as the US Indian Agent and established a trading post on Long Island. He lived there for a decade with his Indian wife Betsy Ward.

The island became a jumping off point for settlers going west by the rivers, including to middle Tennessee and what was developed as Cumberland County. Migrants would reach this area by overland travel, then build flatboats or barges to continue west by water, down the Tennessee River. Such boat-building stimulated the development of the community of Christianville, on the north bank of the Holston and the western end of Long Island.

On January 7, 1806 Henry Dearborn, Secretary of War to President Thomas Jefferson, purchased the island from the Cherokee people on behalf of the United States. It was part of an attempt to settle the western border of the nation. Samuel Woods's descendants succeeded in acquiring the land from the US government in 1810. Richard Netherland, husband of one of Woods's descendants, bought the land from Woods's relatives. He developed a plantation and began industries on the island.

In 1822 the European-American settlements near here, Christianville and Rossville, were chartered together as the Town of Kingsport; it developed as an important regional shipping port on the Holston River in the early 19th century. Goods brought in from the surrounding countryside were loaded onto barges for transport downstream to the Holston's confluence with the Tennessee River (at Knoxville), from where they were shipped to other markets. The young town lost its charter, however, after a downturn in its fortunes precipitated by the Civil War.

=== 20th century to present ===
During the Prohibition era, the island gained a reputation as a site for violence and bootlegging. Smugglers could easily use the river to come and go with their goods.

In 1960 Long Island of the Holston was declared a National Historic Landmark District because of its significance in Indigenous and United States history.

Through the latter 20th century, much of Long Island was developed for heavy industry, especially by Eastman Chemical Company. This dramatically changed its appearance, and few residences or other historic structures remain. Most of the trees and other vegetation were removed from this area. In 1996 National Park Service staff recommended "delisting", removing the district as a National Historic Landmark because of the loss of the island's historic integrity. But it has retained the NHL designation.

On July 16, 1976, the city of Kingsport returned 3.61 acres on the island, described as "Sacred Cherokee ground", to the Eastern Band of Cherokee Indians (EBCI), a federally recognized tribe based in Western North Carolina. Two other Cherokee tribes are based in Oklahoma, where their ancestors were removed by US military forces in the 1830s.

This parcel is part of a city park on the western end of the island. The park also has ball fields and other recreational amenities. As noted above, the US had acquired the island from the Cherokee in 1806 and sold it into private ownership.

The EBCI is the only federally recognized tribe in North Carolina. Since the late 20th century, it has worked to re-acquire sacred sites and former territory of the Cherokee homelands in this region. In western North Carolina, it has acquired several sites containing sacred platform mounds, believed to have been built 1000 years ago or more.

== Demographics ==
Most of the island lies within the corporate boundaries of Kingsport. Long Island's population peaked between 1955 and 1963, holding 517 residences and approximately 1,800 people at the time. As of 2019, only a handful of houses remain on the island.

== In popular culture ==
There is a school of thought that the Long Island Iced Tea is named after Long Island, Tennessee and not Long Island, New York.

== See also ==
- List of National Historic Landmarks in Tennessee
- National Register of Historic Places listings in Sullivan County, Tennessee
