= Adam Stephen =

American doctor and military officer (c. 1718 – 1791)

Member of the Virginia House of Delegates from the Berkeley County, Virginia district
- In office May 1, 1780 – October 16, 1785 Serving with Moses Hunter; Dolphin Drew
- Preceded by: Thomas Hite
- Succeeded by: Philip Pendleton

Personal details
- Born: circa 1718 Scotland
- Died: July 16, 1791 Martinsburg, Virginia
- Education: King's College, Aberdeen
- Profession: doctor

Military service
- Allegiance: Kingdom of Great Britain; United States
- Branch/service: Royal Navy; Virginia Provincial Forces; Continental Army
- Years of service: 1746-1748; 1754-1763; 1775-1777
- Rank: Lieutenant (Great Britain); Lieutenant Colonel - (Virginia Colony); Major general (United States)
- Commands: Virginia Provincial Forces; Continental Army
- Battles/wars: Raid on Lorient; Battle of Jumonville Glen; Battle of Fort Necessity; Braddock Expedition; Timberlake Expedition; Battle of Bushy Run; New York and New Jersey campaigns; Philadelphia campaign; Battle of Germantown

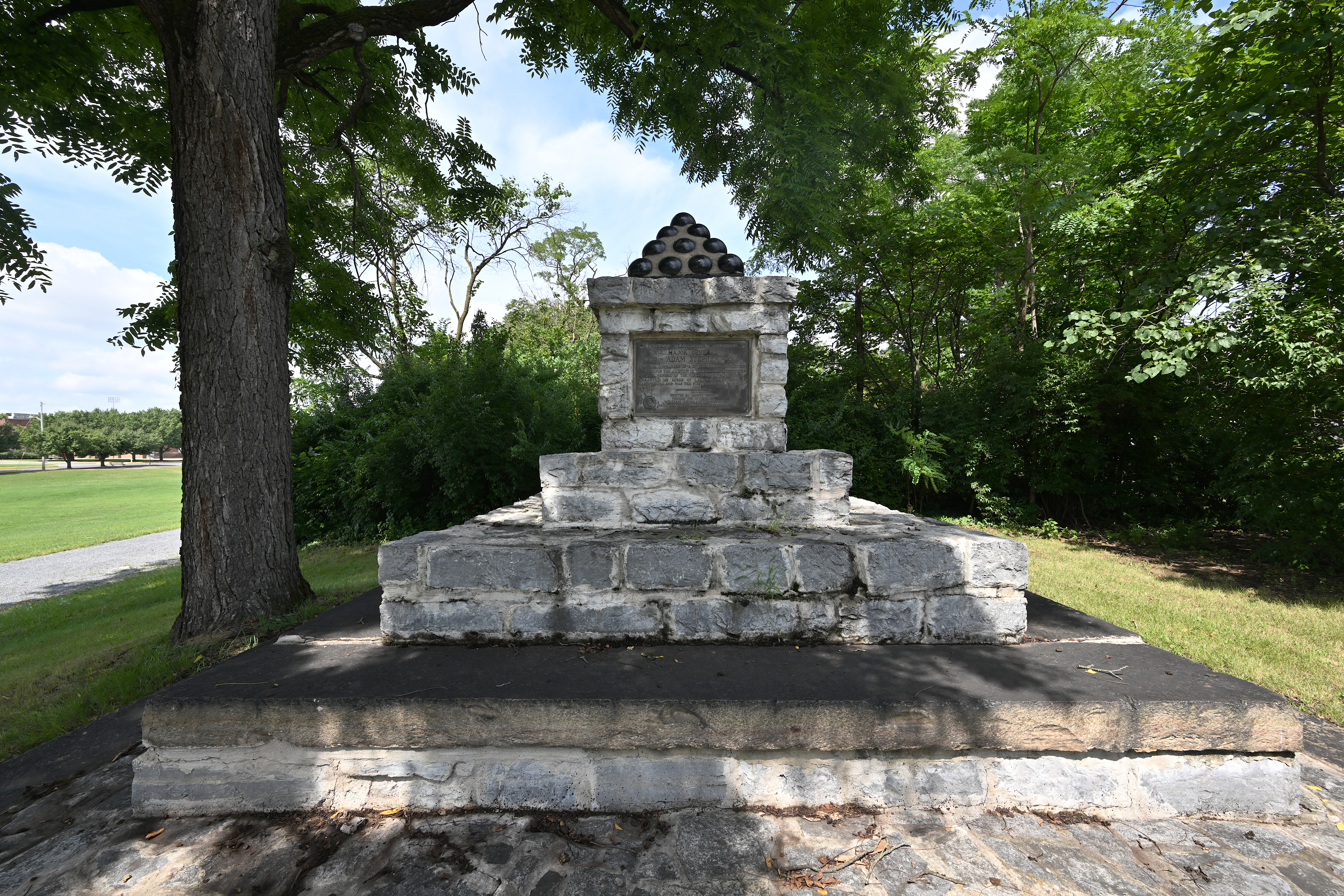
The Adam Stephen monument in Martinsburg, West Virginia

Adam Stephen (c. 1718 – 16 July 1791) was a Scottish-born American doctor and military officer who helped found what became Martinsburg, West Virginia. He emigrated to North America, where he served in the Province of Virginia's militia under George Washington during the French and Indian War. He served under Washington again in the American Revolutionary War, rising to lead a division of the Continental Army. After a friendly fire incident during the Battle of Germantown, Stephen was cashiered out of the army but continued as a prominent citizen of western Virginia, including terms in the Virginia General Assembly representing Berkeley County.

== Early and family life ==
Stephen was born in Scotland. He earned a degree at King's College in Aberdeen, and studied medicine in Edinburgh. Stephen later married and had one child, Ann.

== Naval doctor and emigrant ==
Stephen entered Royal Navy as a surgeon (with possible rank of Lieutenant) after completing medical studies in 1746 and served on a hospital ship during the Siege of Lorient before emigrating to the British colony of Virginia in 1748. There he established a medical practice in Fredericksburg.

== Soldier and pioneer ==
Stephen joined the provincial troops in 1754 and became lieutenant colonel of the Virginia Regiment under George Washington. The unit was based at Winchester (east of the Appalachian Mountains), then explored westward across the Appalachians. The unit was involved in battles at Jumonville Glen and Fort Necessity (both in 1754 and which some consider the opening engagements of the French and Indian War). The following year, Washington, Stephen and the Virginia militia participated in the disastrous Braddock Expedition. In 1756, Stephen led Virginia militiamen against the Creeks to relieve colonists from South Carolina. By 1759, Stephen was in command at Fort Bedford (on the west side of the Appalachian range near the South Branch of the Potomac River) and begged for cattle to be delivered to Fort Pitt (the future Pittsburgh).

In 1761, Stephen had received cattle and other goods necessary to organize and fund the Timberlake Expedition, which attempted to reconcile British and Cherokee interests following the Anglo-Cherokee War (part of the much broader French and Indian War). In the summer of 1763, settlers complained of raids by Delaware and Shawnees on South Branch settlements so that many inhabitants of Hampshire County had abandoned their homes, so in August the governor authorized Stephen to draft 500 men from the militias of Hampshire, Culpeper, Fauquier, Loudoun and Frederick counties and the next month told them to continue guarding the posts on the South Branch and Patterson Creek, lest the Native Americans retaliate for their loss that summer at Bushy Run. While Captain Charles Lewis escorted 60 former settler prisoners back to Fort Pitt in 1764, Stephen had assumed command of the Virginia Regiment from Washington and traveled westward to assist in putting down Pontiac's Rebellion.

When the American Revolutionary War broke out, Stephen offered his services to the Continental Army, again serving under Washington. He was with the army during the New York and New Jersey campaigns of 1776 and early 1777, and as a major general he was given command of a division in Washington's army during the defense of Philadelphia. In the October 1777 Battle of Germantown, Stephen's men fought in the fog with troops led by General Anthony Wayne. Stephen was accused of being drunk during the battle, and after being convicted in a court martial, he was stripped of his command and cashiered out of the army, making him the only Continental Army general court-martialed and immediately dismissed from the service during the war.

== Politician ==
Stephen had lived in western Virginia before the war broke out, and voters from Berkeley County (created in 1772) had elected him as one of their two delegates (alongside Robert Rutherford) to the Second Virginia Revolutionary Convention, which was held at St. John's Episcopal Church in Richmond between March 20 and March 27, 1775. When the war ended, he returned to Berkeley County. In 1778 Stephen laid out the plan for Martinsburg and named the town after his friend, Colonel Thomas Bryan Martin. Stephen became sheriff of Berkeley County, with Martinsburg as the county seat. Generals Horatio Gates and Charles Lee purchased property in the county and lived nearby. In 1780, Berkeley County voters elected Stephen as one of their (part-time) representatives in the Virginia House of Delegates. In 1788, he was elected to the Virginia Ratifying Convention, where he spoke (and voted) in favor of ratification of the Constitution of the United States. Despite opposition by political heavyweights such as Patrick Henry and George Mason, Virginia ratified the Constitution 89 to 79, in large part because western Virginia delegates (including Stephen) supported it 15 to 1.

== Legacy ==
Stephen died in Martinsburg in 1791 and is buried beneath a monument erected in his honor. The Adam Stephen House in Martinsburg and The Bower near Shepherdstown survive today and are listed on the National Register of Historic Places.
