= Harmon Washington Hendricks =

President of the Hendricks Brothers copper trading company

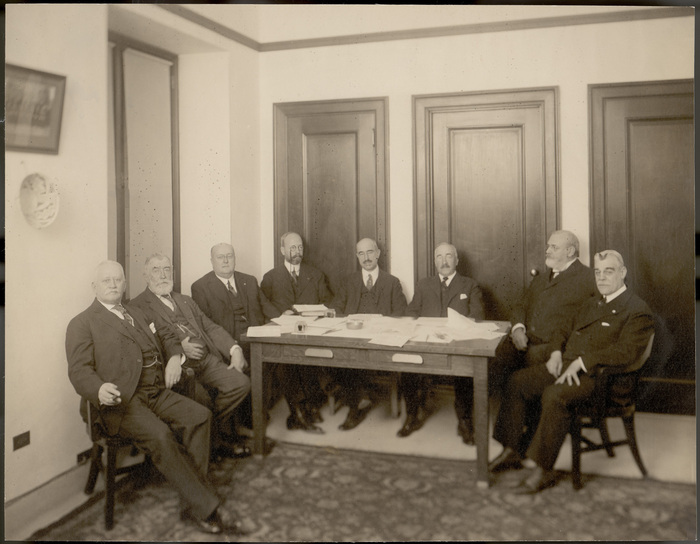
Board of Trustees of the Heye Foundation in 1920, from left to right are: Minor Cooper Keith, James Bishop Ford, George Gustav Heye, Frederic Kimber Seward, F. Kingsbury Curtis, Samuel Riber, Jr., Archer Milton Huntington, and Harmon Washington Hendricks

Harmon Washington Hendricks (1846–1928) was the president of the Hendricks Brothers copper trading company in the United States. He was vice chairman of the board of trustees for the Museum of the American Indian.
