= Minor Cooper Keith =

American businessman (1848–1929)

Minor Keith
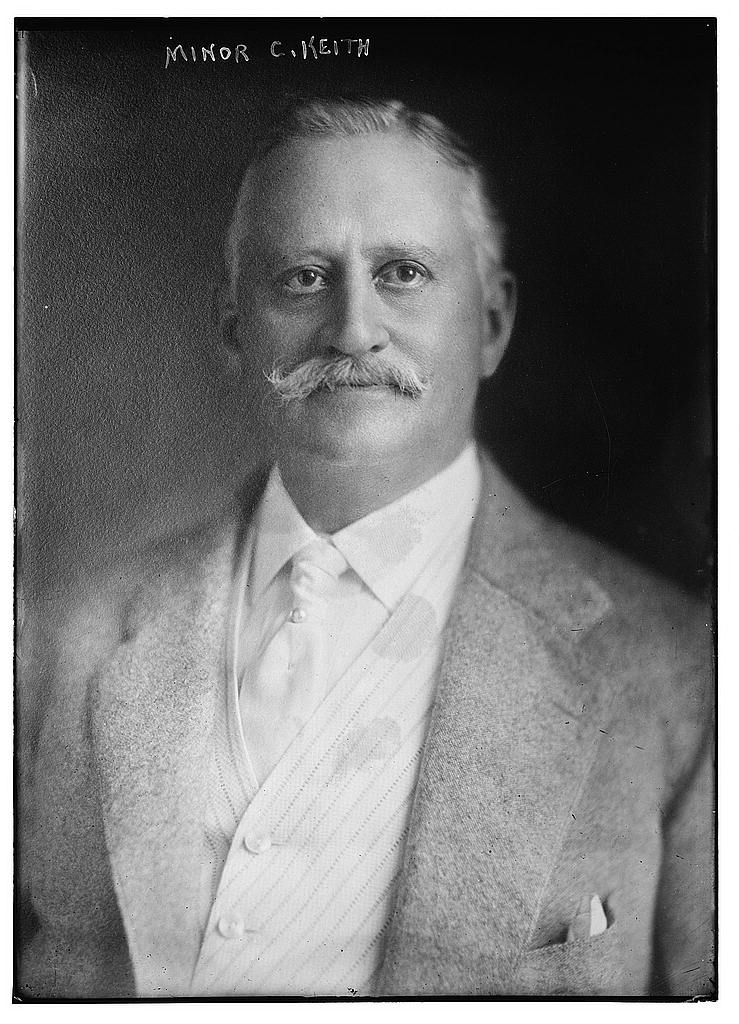
- Keith in 1917
- Born: Minor Cooper Keith; 19 January 1848; Brooklyn, New York
- Died: 14 June 1929 (aged 81); West Islip, New York
- Occupation: American businessman
- Relatives: Henry Meiggs (uncle); José María Castro Madriz (Brother-in-law); Rafael Iglesias Castro (Nephew-in-law); Bernardo Soto Alfaro (Son-in-law)

Minor Cooper Keith (19 January 1848 – 14 June 1929) was an American businessman whose railroad, commercial agriculture, and cargo liner enterprises had a major impact on the national economies of the Central American countries, as well as on the Caribbean region of Colombia. Keith's work on the Costa Rican railroad to the Caribbean, a project begun by his uncle Henry Meiggs, led him to become involved in the large-scale export of bananas to the United States. In 1899, Keith's banana-trading concerns were absorbed into the powerful United Fruit Company, of which he became vice-president. Keith was also involved in a number of other business ventures, including gold mining in Costa Rica and real estate development in the US.

== Early life ==
Keith was born on January 19, 1848, in Brooklyn, New York, at the time its own city. His parents were a lumber merchant Minor Hubbell Keith and his wife Emily, sister of railroad entrepreneur Henry Meiggs. After private schooling, the sixteen-year-old Keith was employed as a store clerk on Broadway. Some months later, he quit clerking and became a lumber surveyor. Having saved $3,000 in a year, Keith bought a cattle ranch located on a river island near the mouth of the Rio Grande, in southern Texas, which he administered until 1871. He then accepted his uncle's invitation to help manage the construction of a railroad in Costa Rica, in Central America.

== Costa Rican railroad ==
In 1871, Keith's uncle Henry Meiggs had signed a contract with the government of Costa Rican president Tomás Guardia Gutiérrez for the construction of a railroad from the capital city of San José to what was to become the Caribbean port of Limón. Minor Keith was involved in the project from the start and took it over after Meiggs's death in 1877.

At the time, Costa Rica's economy was based primarily on the export of coffee, which was grown in the country's central valley and transported by oxcart to the Pacific port of Puntarenas. Since the main market for Costa Rican coffee was in Europe and no canal connecting the Pacific and the Atlantic existed, creating a reliable transportation route to the Caribbean was a priority for the Costa Rican government and business class.

The construction of that railroad proved extraordinarily challenging due to inadequate financing, compounded by the rugged terrain, thick jungle, torrential rains, and prevalence of malaria, yellow fever, dysentery, and other tropical diseases. As many as four thousand people, including Keith's three brothers, died during the construction of the first 25 miles of track, mostly from malaria. Keith was forced to hire foreign laborers, including black workers from Jamaica, as well as some Chinese and even Italians. The Jamaicans that Keith brought in were English speakers and to this day maintain their heritage.

By 1882, the Costa Rican government had defaulted on its payments to Keith and could no longer meet its obligations to the London banks from which it had borrowed to pay for the railroad. Keith managed to raise £1.2 million himself from the banks and from private investors. He also negotiated a substantial reduction of the interest on the money previously lent to Costa Rica, from 7% to 2.5%. In exchange, the government of President Próspero Fernández Oreamuno gave Keith 800,000 acres (324,000 hectares) of tax-free land along the railroad, plus a 99-year lease on the operation of the train route. These terms were made official in a document signed by Keith and cabinet minister Bernardo Soto Alfaro on April 21, 1884 (known to Costa Rican historians as the "Soto-Keith contract"). That land grant corresponded to about 6% of the total territory of Costa Rica.

The two most powerful cabinet ministers in the government of President Fernández were his son-in-law Soto (who succeeded him after his death) and his brother-in-law José María Castro Madriz, who had previously served as President of Costa Rica on two occasions. In 1883 Minor Keith married Cristina Castro Fernández, who was the daughter of Castro Madriz and niece of President Fernández, as well as the cousin-in-law of Soto. Keith's nephew-in-law Rafael Iglesias Castro would serve two consecutive terms as President of Costa Rica, from 1894 to 1902.

== Banana trade ==
The railroad was completed in 1890, but the flow of passengers and cargo proved insufficient to finance Keith's debt. As early as 1873, however, Keith had begun experimenting with the planting of bananas, grown from roots he had obtained from the French. To market the bananas, Keith began running a steamboat line from Limón to New Orleans, in the United States. The resulting banana trade proved lucrative and he soon established the Tropical Trading and Transport Company to organize his banana-export business.

Keith then partnered with M. T. Snyder to establish banana plantations in Panama and in Colombia's Magdalena Department. He eventually came to dominate the banana trade in Central America and Colombia. In 1899, he was forced by a financial setback to combine his venture with Andrew W. Preston's Boston Fruit Company, which dominated the banana trade in the West Indies. The result of the merger was the powerful United Fruit Company, of which Keith became vice-president. In 1904, Keith signed a contract with the President of Guatemala, Manuel Estrada Cabrera, giving the company tax-exemptions, land grants, and control of all railroads on the Atlantic side of the country.

== Other activities ==
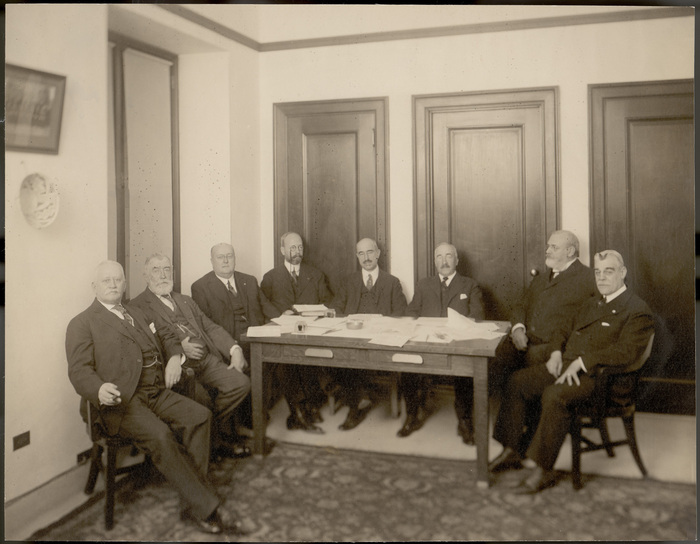
Board of Trustees of the Heye Foundation, 1920. From left to right: Minor C. Keith, James Bishop Ford, George Gustav Heye, Frederic Kimber Seward, Frederick Kingsbury Curtis, Samuel Riber, Jr., Archer Milton Huntington, and Harmon Washington Hendricks.

Keith also invested in gold mining in Abangares, in the Costa Rican province of Guanacaste. In 1912 he returned to railroad building, organizing the International Railways of Central America and eventually completing an 800-mi (1,287-km) railway system, but died before realizing his dream of a line from Guatemala to the Panama Canal. His work profoundly altered the economic life of Central American countries.

Keith also founded a chain of general stores and owned one of the largest poultry farms in the United States. In 1917, Keith acquired huge amounts of the assets of St. Andrews Bay Development Company, which was founded by W. H. Lynn. He also acquired huge tracts of land around the area of Panama City, Florida, formerly owned by R. L. McKenzie and A. J. Gay. Keith and his millions are credited with "putting Bay County on the map" as he also purchased the railroad, the area's mills including the American Lumber Company, over two hundred thousand acres of land, built both the Lynn Haven Hotel and the Pines Hotel in Panama City and developed and constructed a new golf course on North Bay.

Keith was a trustee of the foundation that managed George Gustav Heye's collection of Native American artifacts and he bequeathed his own ancient Native American gold to the American Museum of Natural History in New York City.

== Death and legacy ==
Keith died on 14 June 1929 of bronchial pneumonia at his home in West Islip, Long Island, New York. According to John Dos Passos in his USA Trilogy, Minor Cooper Keith was an example of the phrase "chip off the old block".
