= Frederick Webb Hodge =

American editor, anthropologist, archaeologist and historian

Frederick Webb Hodge (October 28, 1864 – September 28, 1956) was an American editor, anthropologist, archaeologist, and historian. Born in England, he immigrated at the age of seven with his family to Washington, DC. He was educated at American schools, and graduated from Cambridge College (now George Washington University).

He became very interested in Native American history and cultures, and worked for the Bureau of American Ethnology from 1905 to 1918. He collaborated with George Gustav Heye, who had been collecting Native American artifacts, and established the Heye Foundation to support archeological work. Heye founded the Museum of the American Indian in 1916 in New York, where Hodge later served as editor and assistant director. During his time at the Smithsonian, Hodge also conducted archeological expeditions and excavations at Nacoochee Mound in Georgia, and at Hawikuh, near Zuni Pueblo.

== Early years ==
Frederick Webb Hodge was born in 1864 in Plymouth, England to Edwin and Emily (née Webb) Hodge. His parents immigrated to Washington, D.C., United States when Frederick was seven years old. He attended local schools and then studied at Cambridge College (now George Washington University).

== Career ==
He was associated with Columbia University and the U.S. Geological Survey.

Hodge began working in archeology early in his career. He participated in part of the Hemenway Southwestern Archaeological Expedition (1886–1894). There he met Margaret Magill, and they later married. She had accompanied her sister, Emily Tennison Magill Cushing, who was married to expedition leader Frank Hamilton Cushing.

By 1901 Hodge worked as executive assistant in charge of International Exchanges at the Smithsonian Institution. In 1905 he transferred to the Bureau of American Ethnology, now part of the Smithsonian, where he worked on topics in anthropology and Native American culture until February 28, 1918. Hodge was the editor for Edward S. Curtis's monumental photography series, The North American Indian.

Hodge moved to New York City to serve as editor and assistant director at the Museum of the American Indian, founded in 1916 by George Gustav Heye, and his Heye Foundation. In 1915, accompanied by Heye, the museum's director, and staff member George H. Pepper, Hodge undertook archeological excavations at the Nacoochee Mound near Helen, Georgia. These three men published a report on the mound excavations in 1918. It was the first scientific excavation in the state. The museum opened to the public in 1922.

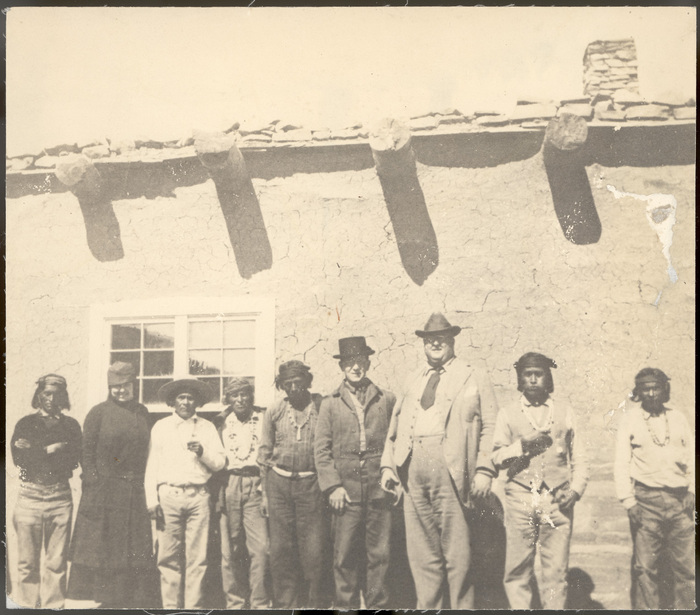
Thea (Mrs. George) Heye (second from left), Frederick Webb Hodge (1864–1956, MAI staff member, sixth from left) and George Gustav Heye (seventh from left) posed outdoors with Zuni Indians in front of a plastered adobe structure with vigas and rocks along roof line.

Hodge directed excavations of the ruins of Hawikuh, near Zuni Pueblo, during the period 1917–23, with what was known as the Hendricks-Hodge Expedition. He researched and reported on the interactions of these aborigines with the Spanish conquerors, travelers and priests since 1539, when Estevanico and Spanish Franciscan friars had intended to set up a mission here.

He founded the American Journal of Physical Anthropology. Hodge was chosen to be the director of the Southwest Museum of the American Indian in Los Angeles. He also served as executive officer at the Smithsonian Institution. There he was chairman of the Committee of Editorial Management and the Committee dealing with the Linguistic Families North of Mexico. He was a member of the Committee on Archaeological Nomenclature, the Committee of Policy, the National Research Council, and the Laboratory of Anthropology, School of American Research.
