= Ye Olde Curiosity Shop =

Store in Seattle, Washington, United States

Coordinates: 47.6043°N 122.3399°W

General information
- Location: Pier 54, 1001 Alaskan Wy, 98104,, Seattle, Washington, United States

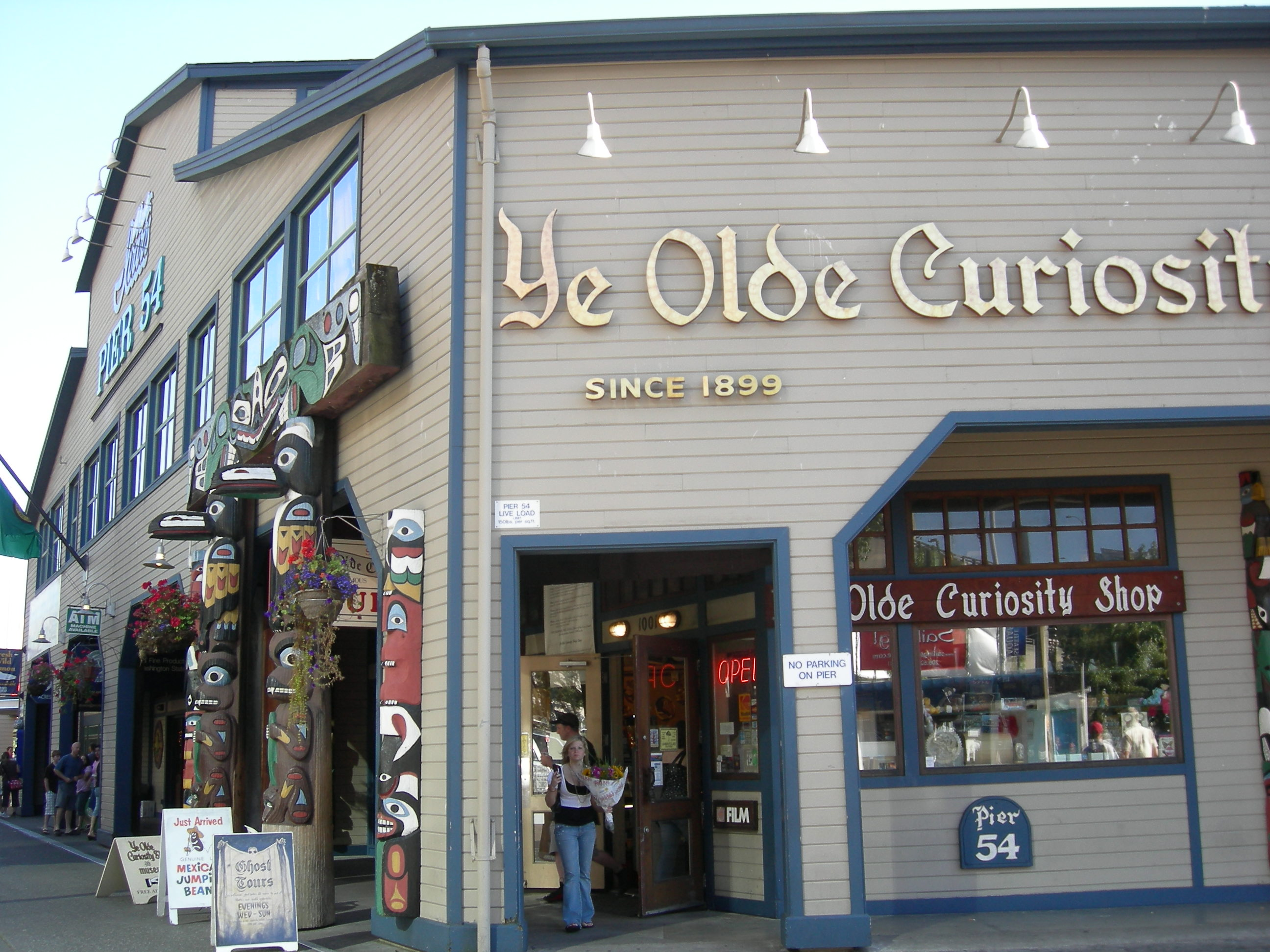
The current shop on Pier 54 (2007)

Ye Olde Curiosity Shop is a store founded in 1899, on the Central Waterfront of Seattle, Washington, United States. It is currently located on Pier 54. Best known today as a souvenir shop and museum, it also has aspects of a dime museum, and is an important supplier of Northwest Coast art to museums. As of 2008, the store has been owned by four generations of the same family.

In 1933, the Seattle Star named Ye Olde Curiosity Shop one of the "Seven Wonders of Seattle", the only shop on the list. The other six Wonders were the harbor, the Ballard Locks, the Boeing airplane factory, the Seattle Art Museum, the Pike Place Market and the University District's Edmond Meany Hotel (now the Graduate Seattle hotel).

== Owners ==
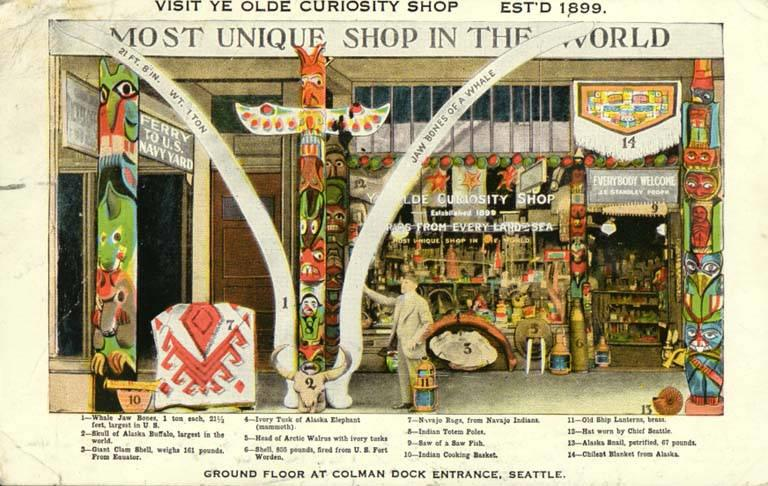
This 1922 postcard shows Ye Olde Curiosity Shop in its home at that time on Colman Dock. Today, this site is part of Pier 50, the Washington State Ferry Terminal. The postcard shows a variety of artifacts on display in front of the shop, including whale jaw-bones ("1 ton each, 22½ feet, largest in U.S."), a giant clam shell ("weighs 161 pounds, from Equator"), a hat worn by Chief Seattle, and several totem poles.

The shop was founded in 1899 by J. E. "Daddy" Standley (born February 24, 1854, in Steubenville, Ohio). He had already traded somewhat in curios and Indian goods as a grocer in Denver, Colorado. When he moved to Seattle in 1899, he encountered a boom town supplying and benefiting from the Klondike Gold Rush.

Standley's exhibit at the 1909 Alaska–Yukon–Pacific Exposition in Seattle drew tourists, scholars, anthropologists, and collectors and was enormous publicity for his already somewhat famous shop. It also won Standley a gold medal in the category of ethnological collections.

Standley's shop presented a mix of curiosities and art objects. He collected and sold what came his way, but also had local Native American artists make objects to his specifications. He sold genuine Tlingit totem poles, but also replicas by carvers descended from the Vancouver Island-based Nuu-chah-nulth tribe, who were living in Seattle, and even inexpensive souvenir totem poles made in Japan. He included items such as shrunken heads from the Amazon (some of them genuine, others probably not).

In addition to the shop, Standley built a home he called "Totem Place" on a 1-acre (4,000 m^{2}) estate in West Seattle. The estate's collection of totem poles, whale bones, and other curiosities replete with a Japanese-style teahouse and a miniature log cabin drew sightseeing tourists.

In 1937 Standley, at the age of 83, was hit by a car on Alaskan Way, the road along the Seattle waterfront, and his leg was broken. He never fully recovered, although he remained active in the business to within 4 days of his death on October 25, 1940. Standley's son Edward joined the shop in 1907 and worked there until his death in 1945. Russell James first joined the business in 1912 and eventually married Standley's daughter. Except for his service in World War I, James worked there until 1952. Standley's grandson Joe James began working in the shop in 1946, and operated the business for over 50 years. Joe James's son Andy and daughter Debbie were also involved in running the business from at least the 1980s.

The shop's current owners, the aforementioned Andy James and his wife Tammy, also owned Market Street Traders (founded 2007, closed 2010) in Seattle's Ballard neighborhood. Market Street Traders specialized in fair trade goods. Prior to that, for about 25 years, the Jameses operated a second waterfront store on Pier 55, known at various times as Waterfront Landmark and Ye Olde Curiosity Shop Too. Ye Olde Curiosity Shop Too closed around the same time Market Street Traders opened.

== Name and location ==
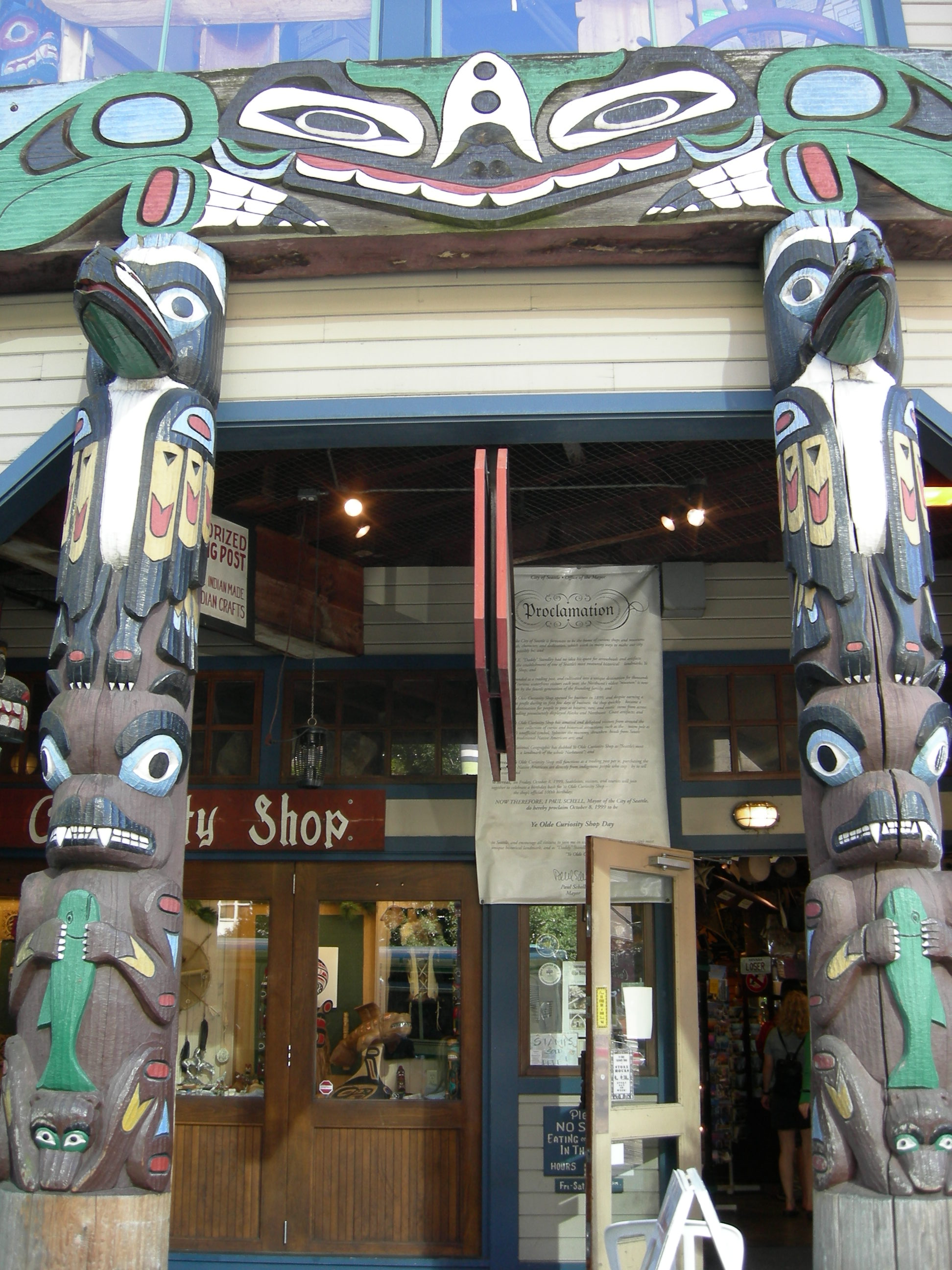
Entrance to the current (Pier 54) shop, flanked by totem poles

Ye Olde Curiosity Shop was founded in late 1899 as Standley's Free Museum and Curio on Second Avenue at Pike Street. It moved in November 1901 and at that time the store was called The Curio; it soon became Standley's Curio. In June 1904 Standley moved his store to the waterfront, renamed it after Charles Dickens's novel The Old Curiosity Shop, and adopted the motto "Beats the Dickens".

In 1963, as the Washington State Ferries system was taking over and completely reworking Colman Dock, the shop moved to a store on Pier 51 designed by Paul Thiry. In April 1988, it moved again, to Pier 54.

== Customers ==
The shop receives about 1 million visitors a year. The shop has had many notable customers over the years. Visitors have included Teddy Roosevelt, J. Edgar Hoover, Jack Dempsey, Charlie Chaplin, Red Skelton, John Wayne, Katharine Hepburn, James Van Der Beek, and Sylvester Stallone. Cartoonist Robert Ripley of "Ripley's Believe It or Not!" bought totem poles and other crafts for his New York estate. The store's logs show that Queen Marie of Romania visited and "sat in the Chinese chair" and that Louis Tiffany bought "curios, idols and a mammoth tusk".

As late as the period from 1976 though 1980, the shop auctioned off 2,000 pieces of Native American art.

== Goods and exhibits ==
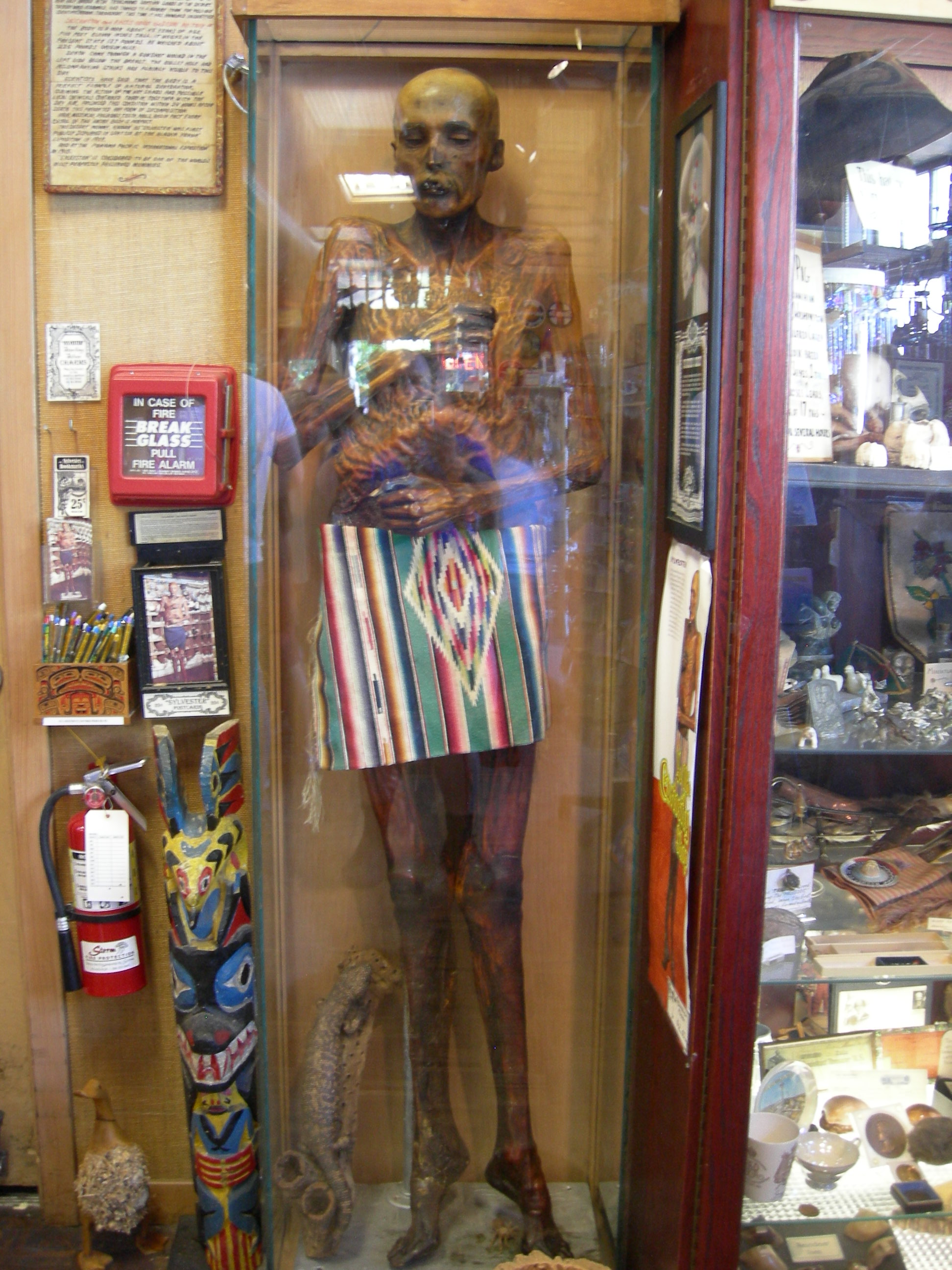
"Sylvester" the mummy

During the early years of the shop, Princess Angeline, daughter of Chief Seattle (after whom the city is named), made baskets which were later sold there.

In its early years, much of the shop's stock came from Alaska. Standley acquired both recent and older Alaskan works of art and craft, as well as natural history specimens, from whalers, traders, revenue cutter captains, Alaska Natives (always referred to at the time as "Eskimos") visiting Seattle, and Alaska shopkeepers functioning as middlemen. Some of those who brought him items, especially in the early years, are likely to have stolen them from their rightful owners in Alaska or to have dug them out of archaeological deposits. Native Alaskan Yup'iks and Iñupiats, who had long been traders, were happy to find a market for items they considered "good for nothing" worn-out cast-off tools and implements.

Today, the store focuses more on display of than sale of items. Display items include an early 19th-century Russian samovar, dozens of totem poles, East Asian weapons, woven cedar mats and fir needle baskets, netsuke, jade carvings, narwhal tusks, and a walrus oosik. Also on display are two mummified human bodies, "Sylvester" and "Sylvia". "Sylvester" (acquired in 1955) functions as an informal symbol of the shop. For years, the general belief has been that he was the victim of a late 19th-century shooting in the Arizona desert, and that the extreme dryness of the desert naturally mummified the body. However, CT scans in 2001, 2005 and an MRI in 2005 suggest an embalmer injected an arsenic-based fluid shortly after death. The body is one of the best-preserved mummies known. Newly published information and a photograph from 1892 indicate that "Sylvester," originally named "McGinty," belonged to confidence man "Soapy" Smith until he sold it in 1895 in Hillyard, Washington.

== Influence ==
Standley and his shop were instrumental in the world's perceiving Seattle as within the region associated strongly with totem poles, even though traditionally those had been associated with areas farther north. The cultural effect of the hybrid or imitative art fostered by Standley and the shop can be clearly seen as early as 1909, when anthropologist Alfred Cort Haddon, in Seattle to lecture at the A-Y-P Exposition, purchased 109 items from the shop for the Horniman Free Museum.

In the early 20th century, Ye Olde Curiosity Shop was, as author Kate Duncan wrote in 2001, "the most varied and visible Indian collection in the city" and "became a stop for visiting Indians and Eskimos, as it remains today". The shop's guest book showed visits from prominent Indians including chiefs of the Cheyenne and Lakota. Most notable in Standley's view, Chief Joseph of the Nez Perce visited in 1902, two years before his death.

Consequently, Standley and his shop had an enormous influence on what was perceived as "authentic" to these cultures. While he always accurately presented (for example) ivory cribbage boards as tourist goods, he was probably himself not aware of the extent to which ivory miniatures and carved tusks from Alaska or Athapaskan beadwork were also hybrid goods produced for the tourist trade that had begun with the gold rush. Similarly, his exhibits in his store and elsewhere did not distinguish between pre-contact and post-contact artifacts.

Ye Olde Curiosity Shop also influenced local Seattle retailing of Indian artifacts. At the time Ye Olde Curiosity Shop was founded, the few existing Seattle shops selling Indian artifacts were focused mainly on baskets; such shops were mostly short-lived, although one operated at least from 1901 to 1914, offering a somewhat broader inventory. While Ye Olde Curiosity Shop was the unquestionable local leader in its field well beyond Standley's lifetime, its success brought some serious local rivals into the business. The Hudson Bay Fur Company (later Alaska Fur Company, no relation to the Hudson's Bay Company), founded in the 1880s, established a curio department in the 1900s with a stock similar to Standley's, though not as extensive. That department lasted into the 1940s; the business closed in the 1950s. It operated from 1933 at least into the 1950s.

== Further J. E. Standley influence in Seattle ==
Standley was a constant booster of Seattle, to the point of being described toward the end of his life as a "one-man-chamber-of-commerce". Not all of his influence in Seattle was through the shop itself. From 1904, he provided exhibits for the informal museum of the city's Alaska Club (merged in 1908 into the Arctic Club). He provided an ethnological exhibit for the 1909 A-Y-P Exposition's Alaska Building, as well as lending natural history specimens for the Washington State Building. His Alaskan ethnological exhibit won the exposition's gold medal in its category, and its contents were eventually purchased by George Gustav Heye for the Museum of the American Indian in New York.

Also at the time of the A-Y-P Exposition, he helped promote the then-private Ravenna Park not far north of the exposition grounds. At the time, the park still contained a considerable number of old growth trees, as well as various tourist amenities. Standley provided a set of six totem poles and a war canoe for the private park and played a role in the sale of the park to the city in 1911.
