= Nacoochee Mound =

Archaeological site in Georgia, US

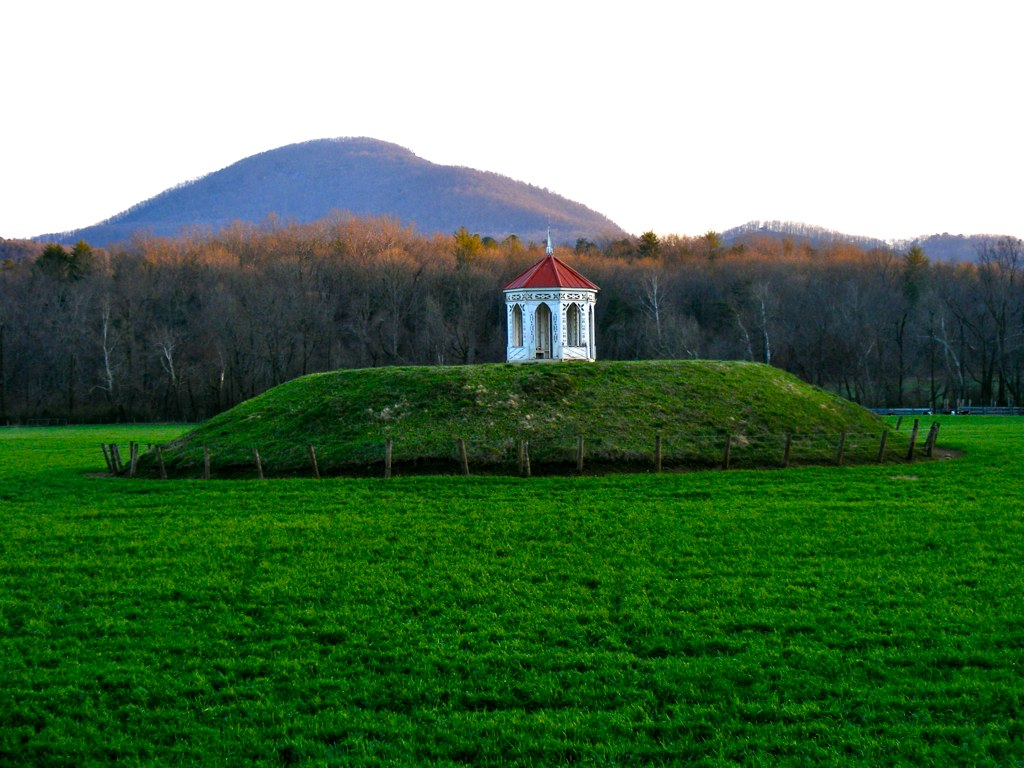
- The Nacoochee Mound

- Location within modern Georgia
- 34.68351°N 83.709°W
- Periods: Early Middle Woodland, Lamar phase
- Cultures: South Appalachian Mississippian culture
- Location: Helen, Georgia, White County, Georgia, USA
- Region: White County, Georgia

History
- Built: 100 BCE
- Abandoned: 1600 CE

Site notes
- Architectural style: platform mound Number of temples: 1
- Sautee Valley Historic District
- U.S. National Register of Historic Places
- NRHP reference No.: 86002742
- Added to NRHP: August 20, 1986
- Excavation dates: 1915, 2004
- Archaeologists: Frederick Webb Hodge, George H. Pepper

The Nacoochee Mound (Smithsonian trinomial 9WH3) is an archaeological site on the banks of the Chattahoochee River in White County, in the northeast part of the U.S. state of Georgia. Georgia State Route 17 and Georgia State Route 75 have a junction near here.

First occupied as early as 100-500 CE by Woodland culture people, the site was later developed and occupied more intensively from 1350 to 1600 CE by peoples of the South Appalachian Mississippian culture (a regional variation of the Mississippian culture). The latter people built a characteristic platform mound at this site, and evidence of related villages were found both east and west of the mound. A professional archeological excavation revealed a total of 75 human burials, with artifacts that support dating of the site.

The late 19th-century gazebo was installed on top of the mound in 1890 by a European-American owner of the land. After the mound was excavated, former governor Lamartine Griffin Hardman had a reconstruction of it built on his property south of Helen, Georgia.

George Gustav Heye, sponsor of the original excavation in 1915, claimed that the historic Cherokee had inhabited the site, which was within their homelands. A 1955 historical marker on the site refers to such habitation. But, James B. Langford of The Coosawattee Foundation says that the excavation necessary to confirm such a claim has not been performed.

A 1734 land grant between Great Britain and the Cherokee lists Nacoochee (Cherokee: ᎾᎫᏥ, romanized: Nagutsi) as a town of Cherokee territory but does not describe its exact location.

The archeological site is part of the Sautee Valley Historic District. It was added to the National Register of Historic Places on August 20, 1986 as reference number 86002742.

== Site description ==
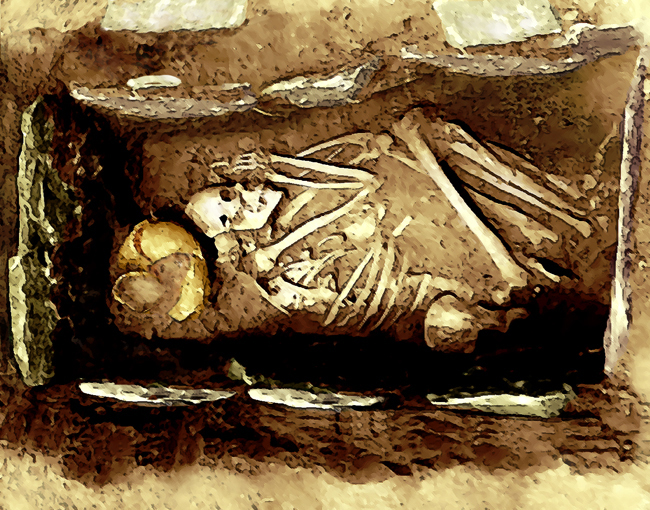
Mississippian stone box grave, showing arranged position of human remains

In the 1870s, the mound site was owned by Captain John H. Nichols, who reported plowing up stone box graves to the west of the mound. (These are now known to be typical artifacts of the Mississippian culture.) Charles C. Jones described the mound as being 16 feet (4.9 m) in height, in his 1873 report on Native American sites in Georgia. In 1890 Captain Nichols removed the top 2 feet (0.61 m) of the mound and built a gazebo on its new summit, a feature that became noted locally.

The mound was formally excavated in 1915 by a team of archaeologists headed by Frederick Webb Hodge and George H. Pepper and sponsored by the Heye Foundation, the Museum of the American Indian in New York, and the Bureau of American Ethnology (now part of the Smithsonian Institution). This is considered one of the earliest scientific archeological excavations in the state.

The Museum of the American Indian and Heye Foundation published the book by Heye, Hodge and Pepper about the excavation, The Nacoochee Mound in Georgia (1918), which included photographs. The excavation showed two intervals of mound construction. It uncovered 75 human burials, including 56 adults, seven adolescents, and four children. Eight other bodies were too degraded for their ages to be determined.

The burials were layered, dating from different time periods. About a third of the individuals were buried with artifacts indicative of social status, including hammered copper and stone celts, conch shell beads and cups, and elaborate Mississippian culture pottery. Some later burials included glass beads and sheet brass ornaments, indicating that these were intrusive burials from the 17th-century contact period with Europeans.

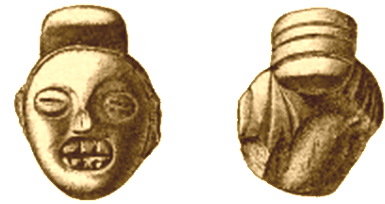
A clay effigy of a human head unearthed by the Heye Foundation expedition

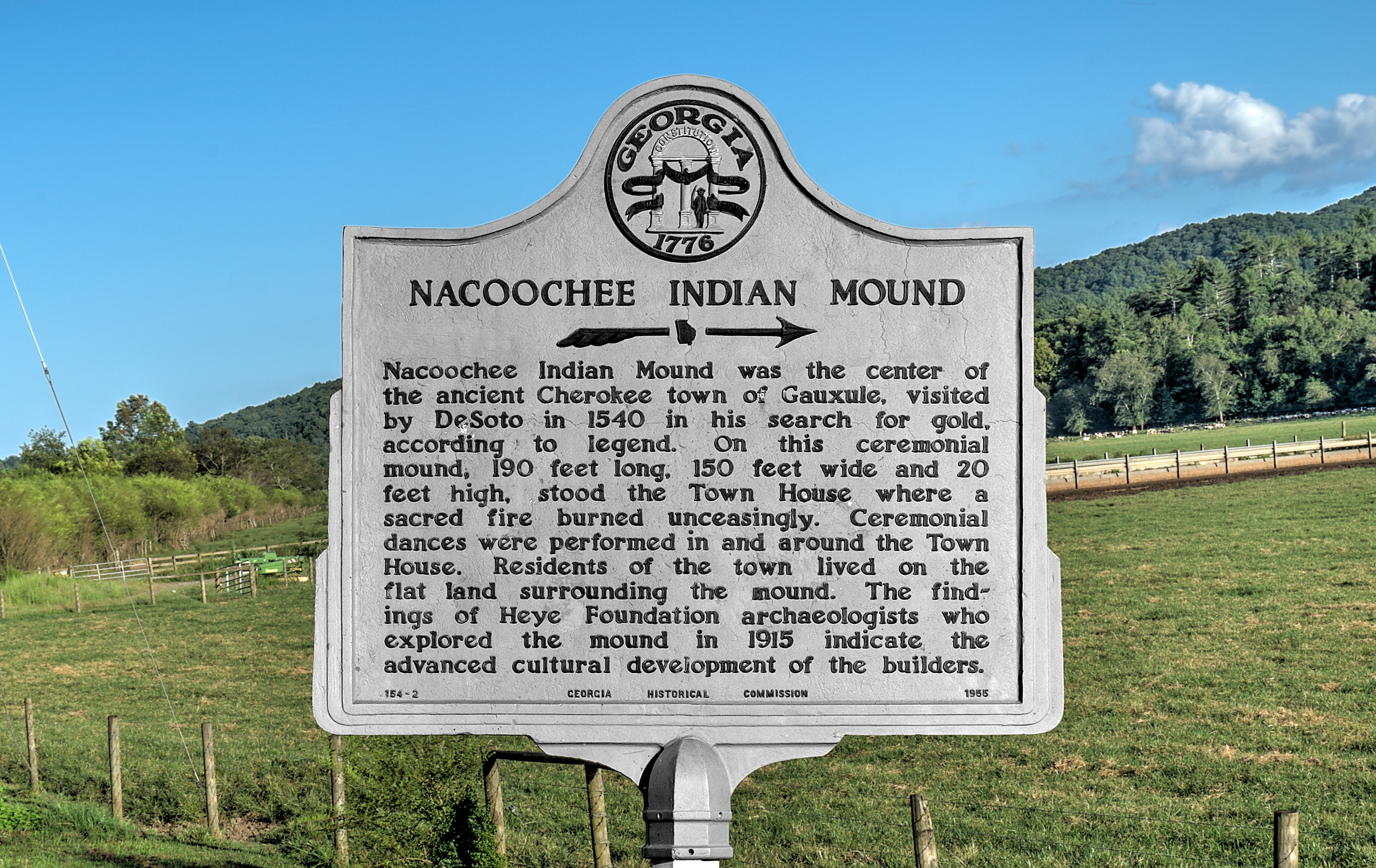
Georgia State Historical Marker, dated 1955

Test excavations at the site in 2004 by the University of Georgia Archaeology Field School resulted in evidence that, combined with current knowledge and theory, enabled refinement of dating related to inhabitants of the site. Some 87 postholes were made around the village site, the first excavation at the village. It was first occupied during the Early Middle Woodland Cartersville Phase.

The village was revealed to have been most intensively occupied during the Mississippian period, from 1350 to 1600 CE during the Lamar phase, when the platform mound is believed to have been constructed. It is a characteristic construction of the period, associated with ceremonial and ritual uses. In addition, pottery sherds characteristic of the Etowah Indian Mounds site in Cartersville, Georgia were found at the site and are evidence that the two sites were occupied during the same time period. A small village area was located in the field to the east of the mound. A much larger village area in the field to the west of the mound was found to have been occupied primarily during the later period.

Archaeological evidence suggests that Nacoochee Mound site, and a nearby mound site called the Eastwood Site (9Wh2), served as local administrative centers for associated villages in the late 15th century and early 16th centuries. The village was not fully excavated.

James B. Langford suggests that it may have been occupied later than the period above. Nacoochee and Chota were noted as Cherokee towns in this valley by the Colonel George Chicken expedition of 1715-1716 to the interior following the Yamasee War. These towns were later shown on maps of the area. This site may have been one of the villages. Both Nacoochee and Chota towns were abandoned by the Cherokee after the mid-eighteenth century.

A bronze state historical marker at the site, dated 1955, says that, according to legend, it is the "ancient Cherokee town of Gauxule, visited by Hernando de Soto in 1540". While there was speculation about De Soto's path, later 20th-century scholars do not believe the early translations of his chronicles were accurate. Since then scholars have pieced together De Soto's route based on the use of topographic and geographic data, as well as the chronicles. Some parts are still disputed.

The original Nacoochee Mound was partially excavated. Former Georgia governor Lamartine Griffin Hardman had a reconstruction of this mound built at his estate in the Nacoochee Valley in White County, two miles south of Helen. It still stands.

== See also ==
- List of Mississippian sites
- Kenimer site
