= George Gustav Heye =

Collector of Native American artifacts (1874–1957)

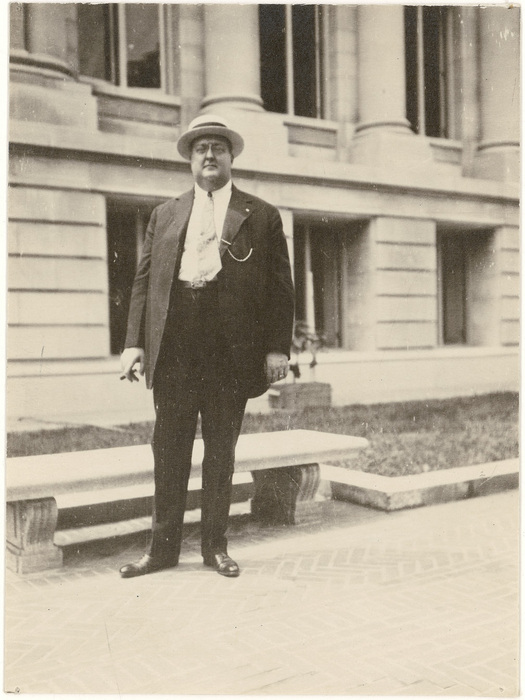
- Heye in 1917
- Born: 1874
- Died: January 20, 1957 (aged 82–83)
- Education: Columbia University
- Occupations: engineer, investment banker
- Known for: Collector and authority on Indigenous peoples of the Americas
- Notable work: Museum of the American Indian

George Gustav Heye (1874 – January 20, 1957) was an American collector of Native American artifacts in the Western Hemisphere, particularly in North America. He founded the Museum of the American Indian, and his collection became the core of the National Museum of the American Indian.

Heye's collection is described as the largest and most comprehensive of its kind in the world. During his years of collecting and study, Heye funded numerous archeological expeditions and supported scholarly work of the time. He established the Heye Foundation in the early 20th century to support such work, as well as contributing independently.

== Life and career ==
Heye was born in 1874, the son of Carl Friederich Gustav Heye and Marie Antoinette Lawrence of Hudson, New York. His father was a German immigrant who earned wealth in the new petroleum industry.

George Gustav Heye graduated from Columbia School of Mines (now Columbia School of Engineering and Applied Science) in 1896 with a degree in electrical engineering. While superintending railroad construction in Kingman, Arizona in 1897, Heye acquired a Navajo deerskin shirt, his first Native American item. He continued to acquire individual items until 1903, then he began collecting material in larger numbers.

In 1901, Heye started a career in investment banking that lasted until 1909. His success gave him the financial means to fund archeological expeditions conducted by scholars in the field. For instance, he funded an expedition in 1907 to Ecuador and Colombia by Professor Saville of the Department of Anthropology of Columbia University, Heye's alma mater. Saville had already completed two expeditions to sites in those countries.

Heye continued with his interest in Native American culture, funding archeological surveys and excavations in the American Southeast. The field was young, but he supported some of the most professional work of the time. In 1915, Heye worked with Frederick W. Hodge and George H. Pepper on the Nacoochee Mound in White County, Georgia. The work on Nacoochee Mound was done through the Heye Foundation, the Museum of the American Indian (which opened in 1922), and the Bureau of American Ethnology of the Smithsonian Institution. It was some of the most complete work of the time, including numerous photographs. In 1918, Heye and his colleagues published a report entitled The Nacoochee Mound In Georgia.

Also from 1915 to 1919, the Heye Foundation sponsored a team excavating the James Plott Mound (later referred to as Mound#3) at the Garden Creek site west of Asheville, in Haywood County, North Carolina. The Foundation published a report on this in 1919. Other parts of the archeological site were excavated in 1965–1967, including two villages and two earthwork mounds.

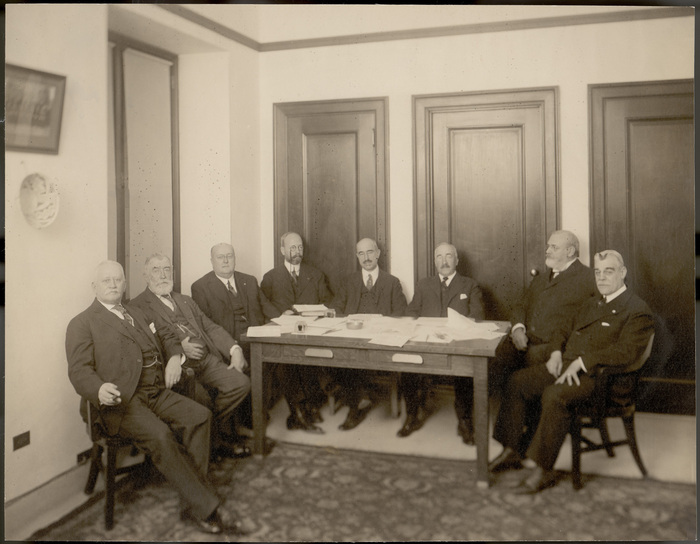
The Board of Trustees of the Heye Foundation in 1920; left to right: Minor Cooper Keith, James Bishop Ford, George Gustav Heye, Frederic Kimber Seward, F. Kingsbury Curtis, Samuel Riber, Jr., Archer Milton Huntington, and Harmon Washington Hendricks

By 1908, Heye was referring to the collection as "The Heye Museum." He began to lend materials for exhibit at the University of Pennsylvania, at what later became its Museum of Archaeology and Anthropology in Philadelphia.

In 1916, he purchased the collection of Alaskan Native artifacts that had won the gold medal for ethnological collections at the 1909 Alaska–Yukon–Pacific Exposition, from J. E. Standley of Ye Olde Curiosity Shop. Eventually, the Heye collection was moved to the Heye Foundation's Museum of the American Indian at 155th Street and Broadway, which broke ground in May 1916. He had been encouraged to build there by Archer Milton Huntington, who had already established The Hispanic Society of America in its own building and sponsored a complex of cultural institutions.

In 1919, Heye founded the journal Indian Notes and Monographs. The Museum of the American Indian opened to the public in 1922. It closed in 1994, after the collection had been moved in 1989 to the Smithsonian Institution. In 1994 the George Gustav Heye Center of the National Museum of the American Indian opened in the former Alexander Hamilton U.S. Custom House near Battery Park in Lower Manhattan.

Heye died on January 20, 1957, at his house in the Ritz Tower in New York City.. He is interred in Woodlawn Cemetery in the Bronx, New York City.

== Museum of the American Indian ==
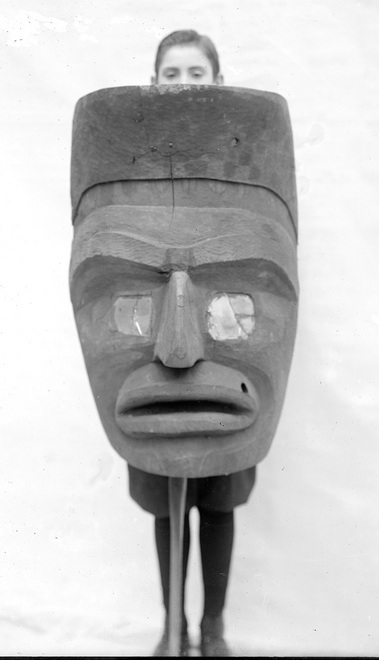
Boy holding a very large Kwakiutl mask, Museum of the American Indian, circa 1920

Heye created the Museum of the American Indian in 1916 in New York City and was its director until 1956. The collection contains over one million objects, particularly from Native Americans, Inuit and Alaskan Natives, and also other indigenous peoples of the Western Hemisphere. The collection was transferred to the Smithsonian Institution in 1989, which established the National Museum of the American Indian. (It now has two locations, in New York City and in Washington, DC.)

About one-third of the original collection has been repatriated under the National Museum of the American Indian Act. This federal legislation recognized that grave goods and other sacred items had been taken from Native American tribes without permission through archeological and other collecting expeditions. Artifacts were once stored in the Bronx in a building along the Interstate 95 corridor. After the land and building were sold, the property was cleared for redevelopment as private housing.

After 1930, the library of the Museum formed the bulk of the Native American Collection at the Huntington Free Library. The 40,000+ books and archival artifacts were sold to Cornell University in 2004.

== Membership ==
- American Anthropological Association
- American Museum of Natural History
- American Geographical Society
- American Association for the Advancement of Science
- The Explorers Club; he served twice as president, from 1922 to 1925 and 1928 to 1930

== Publications ==
- George G. Heye, Frederick W. Hodge, and George H. Pepper, The Nacoochee Mound in Georgia. New York: Museum of the American Indian, Heye Foundation, 1918.
