= Dockstader =

Dockstader is a surname. Notable people with this surname include:

- Dan Dockstader (born 1958), American politician
- Earnest A. Dockstader (died 1970), American football and basketball coach
- Frederick J. Dockstader (1919–1998), Native American anthropologist and author
- Lew Dockstader (1856–1924), American comedian
- Nicholas Dockstader (1802–1871), American businessman
- Tod Dockstader (1932–2015), American composer
