= Frederick Seward =

Frederick Seward may refer to:

- Frederic Kimber Seward (1878–1943), prominent corporate lawyer in New York City, and survivor of the sinking of the RMS Titanic
- Frederick W. Seward (1830–1915), American Assistant Secretary of State, son of William Henry Seward, Sr. and Frances Adeline Seward and elder brother of General William Henry Seward, Jr.
