= Church Rockshelter No. 2 Site =

Church Rockshelter No.2 Site
- Type: Rock shelter
- Location: Watauga County
- Region: North Carolina, US

Site notes
- Excavation dates: The 1970s, 1975, and 2011
- Archaeologists: Havard G.Ayers, Thomas R. Whyte
- Discovered: The mid-1900s by Charles Church

Church Rockshelter No.2 site situates near the Watauga River in Watauga County, North Carolina. It locates upstream from its twin site Church Rockshelter No.1 site. The No.2 site is east-southeast facing and includes two rock shelters formed by a Cranberry Gneiss outcrop. There is a lower shelter at the northern end and an upper shelter at the southern end. The site is owned by Charles Church, who discovered the site in the mid-1900s by finding many projectile points on the ground surface . A total of three excavations explored the site in the 1970s, 1975 and 2011 respectively. The site contains primarily stone and ceramic evidence from Early to Late Woodland period.

== Excavation history ==
The first excavation of the site is estimated in the early 1970s. Larry Waters, a local collector, visited the site and discovered that a pit in the northern part of the shelter had been excavated. He sent the artifacts collected from the vandal spoil to the Appalachian State University (later referred ASU) Department of Anthropology. In April 1975, Steve Crisco, a student of ASU, recorded this site and reported some disruptive activities. Upon his report, Harvard G. Ayers of ASU led his Field Archaeology class and excavated it three months later. In June 2011, Thomas R. Whyte's led ASU's Field Archaeology class excavated the site to relocate and sample Ayer's excavation contexts with more advanced techniques.

== Artifacts and remains ==
=== Stone artifacts ===
The site contains a total of 415 stone artifacts from the three excavations. The recovered artifacts include fire-cracked rocks, modified and unmodified cobbles, and pebbles, and chipped-stone tools and debitage. There are more alluvial fire-cracked rocks than colluvial ones, implying the former was selected as boiling stones, and the latter were natural exposure to heat sources. The identified cobble tools include two direct percussion hammers, one bipolar percussion hammer, and a pitted cobble used for bipolar percussion or nut cracking. Chipped-stone debitage contains byproducts of bifacial thinning (soft-hammer percussion), core reduction (hard-hammer percussion), and bipolar (compression) flaking. These include local and non-local materials, which are traced to formations 20 km, 40 km, or further away from the site.

=== Ceramic artifacts ===
There are 33 vessel fragments from the upper area and 133 others from the lower area. Those recovered from the upper shelter have visible surface treatments such as cord marks and tempered materials. Most fragments recovered from the lower shelter are assigned to Watts Bar series, and some are assigned to an unnamed Middle Woodland phase or the Late Woodland Radford series. One thickened and punctuated vessel rim is considered to be influenced by the Mississippian Pisgah phase. The rectilinear-stamped pottery from the site is assigned to the Pisgah series, suggesting a Mississippian Pisgah phase component.

=== Archaeofaunal remains ===
All three excavations had discovered remains include fragments of bone, teeth, and shells. The identifiable specimens include a Hellbender, a toad, an Eastern Box Turtle, a Wild Turkey, a rabbit, and nine White-tailed Deer. Most of the samples had been charred, and none shows evidence of artificial modification.

=== Archaeobotanical remains ===
The 1975 excavation recovered three wood charcoal samples and were sent for radiocarbon dating. The 2011 excavation yielded more specimens, including carbonized nutshell, seeds, and wood; these specimens weren't analyzed in 2013.

== Significance ==
The artifacts recovered in the site represent Early and Late Woodland components. The Nolichucky type arrowheads and Watts Bar pottery indicate the Early Woodland component, and the small triangular arrowheads and grit-tempered pottery indicate the Late Woodland component. In addition, rectilinear-stamped pottery and Pisgah arrow suggest exchange or visitation with neighboring Mississippian settlements.

There is no architecture and little cooking facilities in the site, and there are no abundant animal or plant remains; the archaeologists deduced that the site is likely used for seasonal or special purposes.

The site correlates with Church Rockshelter No.1 site in many aspects. They both contain a number of stone and ceramic fragments indicating seasonal visits to the locations by inhabitants during the Woodland period. The Mississippian pottery discovered in two sites suggests a continued use of the sites during the Little Ice Age (ca 900-1300 CE) that followed. However, Church Rockshelter No.1 site contains a Late Woodland human burial and includes few Early Woodland and Mississippian components. The archaeologists consider a further investigation of rock shelter context in the upper Watauga River valley to be helpful.
