= Garden Creek site =

Archaeological site in North Carolina, US

- Location within North Carolina today
- 35°31′1.96″N 82°50′45.02″W
- Periods: Pisgah phase
- Cultures: South Appalachian Mississippian culture
- Location: Haywood County, North Carolina, United States

History
- Built: 600
- Abandoned: 1200

Site notes
- Architectural styles: platform mound, plaza

Garden Creek site is an archaeological site located 24 miles (39 km) west of Asheville, North Carolina in Haywood County, on the south side of the Pigeon River and near the confluence of its tributary Garden Creek. It is near modern Canton and the Pisgah National Forest. The earliest human occupation at the site dates to 8000 BCE. The 12-acre site features remains of two villages (31Hw7) occupied first in the Woodland period and, most prominently, in the Pisgah phase (1000 to 1450/1500 CE) associated with the South Appalachian Mississippian culture. A total of four earthwork mounds have been found at the site; three have been excavated.

One of the three Garden Creek Mounds (31Hw1-3) is believed to have been constructed by indigenous peoples during the Middle Woodland period, or Connestee phase (200 CE to 600 CE). Another, now mostly disappeared, is believed constructed after that. The third and largest was constructed last, in the Pisgah phase. (A fourth mound was discovered in this area in the early 21st century but it has not been excavated or dated.)

== Description ==
There were three periods of excavation at the site: in the late 1880s, 1915–1919, and 1965–1967. Most of the evidence discussed here about Mounds #1 and #2 and the village sites was derived during the third and most professional excavation, conducted by an archeological team associated with the Cherokee Project at the University of North Carolina. As noted, the earliest human occupation was dated to 8000 BCE.

The smaller earthen platform mound was constructed during the Middle Woodland era, by people living from 200 CE to 600 CE. They likely had some dwellings near the mound, but the more sizeable villages found did not develop until later.

The two villages located on the site were occupied from 600 CE to 1200 CE, first by Woodland period Hopewellian peoples, and later by people of the Pisgah phase of the South Appalachian Mississippian culture (about 1000 to 1200 CE).

Pisgah-phase artifacts found in Mound #1 and at the site "are widely thought to represent a continuum of cultural development through which historic Cherokee culture and communities took shape." This area was part of the historic Cherokee homelands in western North Carolina, as the region was later known. After being surveyed in the 1960s, the site was largely destroyed by development of residential housing.

== Site features ==
The 12-acre (49,000 m^{2}) site is located on the south side of the Pigeon River, near the confluence of its tributary Garden Creek. It includes remains of two permanent villages and three earthwork mounds which have been excavated. (A fourth mound was found at the site from field research here in the early 21st century.) The largest village, designated 31Hw7, was located on a terrace overlooking Garden Creek, a tributary of the Pigeon River. A smaller village with a conical earthwork mound is located nearby.

Mound #1 is designed Hw 8 or 31Hw1. Mound #2 is located 1,000 feet (300 m) to the west of the first, and numbered as Hw 7 or 31Hw2. The remains of Mound #3, known as Hw 3 or 31Hw3, is located on the site's south side. It was excavated in 1915 by a team of the Heye Foundation. Because they were not following modern protocols, important information about stratigraphy and provenance was lost. The mound was constructed prior to the Pisgah phase. By the 1960s, nothing remained of that mound.

Mound #1 (Hw 8 or 31HW1) is a late Woodland Pisgah phase site (1000 to 1450 CE). It was the largest mound at the site. In addition, a wattle-and-daub post house was found at Mound #1.

The remains of two earth lodges, rare in the Southern Appalachian Summit, were found below the base of Mound #1. "These were semi-underground, earth-embanked buildings that were built side-by-side and connected by a passageway. The larger of the two structures was 28 feet square and had a clay bench along all four walls. The smaller earth lodge was 20 feet square and had a clay bench along the wall adjacent to the entryway." The only entry into the larger lodge was through the passageway from the smaller one. They are believed to have been used as council houses.

After being used for some time, the lodges were covered over and became the base of a platform mound, now known as Mound #1. At first earth and refuse from a village midden (5 acres in area) was added around the two adjoining lodges, leaving the roofs exposed. When those collapsed, more layers of clay and fill were added, eventually creating a stable platform mound. It is believed to have been as large as 50 x 70 feet in this early phase. The remains of two houses were found on the summit, both constructed on the west side. There were burials of human remains on the east side of the mound.

At the time of excavation, Mound #1 had expanded in the base to 150-ft by 130-ft, and was about 7 ft high. It is believed to have been several feet higher during its peak period. But with European-American occupation of this area, farmers conducted more than 100 years of cultivation of the site, lowering the height of the mound.

Mound #2, a platform mound, was excavated by Bennie Keel of UNC. In 1965 it was approximately 110 feet north–south and 150 feet east–west at the base, and 4 feet high. It was believed to have been several feet higher when in use in the Connestee Phase. Based on ceramic chronology and a radiocarbon date from the top of the mound, he attributed construction of this structure to people of the Middle Woodland Connestee phase, who would have lived from about 200 to 600 CE. It is the older and smaller of the two mounds excavated in the 1960s.

== Artifacts ==
Garden Creek mounds #2 and 1 (in order of age) both held Marginella shells and conch shell gorgets. Several gorgets were incised with coiled rattlesnakes in the Lick Creek style, and one featured a stylized human figure. As the shells came from the Gulf Coast, they were evidence of far-flung trading networks.

Artifacts found in Mound #1 include ground stone celts, made of peridotite and slate. Stone anvils, hammerstones, manos, and mortars were also unearthed, as well as fragments of cut mica and elbow-shaped clay smoking pipes.

Bone tools, such as awls, punches, and perhaps needles, were fashioned from deer and turkey bone splinters. Turtle shell rattles, from Terrapene carolina shells and small round pebbles, were found in Mound #1. Shell artifacts were sculpted from marine mollusk shells: large shell beads shaped into spheres or discs, and strung into necklaces and bracelets, were made from Busycon (or conch) columella. A single shell pin was found in Mound #1, as well as a conch bowl.

Woven rivercane mats left impressions in Earth Lodge 2, found in the base of Mound #1. Some charred remains were found on a house floor. Although organic materials decompose rapidly in the Southern Appalachian climate, fragile textiles, such as cloth, netting, and cordage, could be detected by the impressions the textiles left on clay. Two pieces of copper were found at the site. These were another sign of trade, as copper is not available locally.

== Archaeological surveys ==
In the late 1880s Mann S. Valentine and his sons, of the Valentine Museum of Richmond, Virginia, hired local man A. J. Osborne to excavate the Garden Creek site, seeking artifacts for their museum. From 1915 to 1919, the Heye Foundation team excavated Mound #3. They did not take field notes or record provenance of artifacts taken from the site, and the mound has nearly disappeared.

Bennie Keel and others working on the Cherokee Project, from the Research Laboratories of Anthropology at the University of North Carolina, excavated two mounds and villages at Garden Creek from 1965 to 1967, when the site was threatened by planned development. Keel conducted excavation of Mound #2.

== Today ==
The site and history of Garden Creek is recounted on North Carolina Highway Historical Marker P-83. In addition, the site and two mounds are discussed in some detail on the UNC website, Ancient North Carolinians, a virtual museum of archeology in the state. After being surveyed by archeologists in the 1960s, when some excavation took place, the archeological site has since been largely destroyed by a residential development.
