= Frederick J. Dockstader =

Oneida-Navajo anthropologist (1919–1998)

- Born: February 3, 1919; Los Angeles, California, U.S.
- Died: March 21, 1998 (aged 79)
- Education: Northern Arizona University; Case Western Reserve University
- Occupations: Author, ethnologist, curator, teacher
- Spouse: Alice Warren
- Writing career
- Period: 1950–1998
- Genre: Nonfiction
- Subject: Native American art
- Notable works: Indian Art in America : The arts and crafts of the North American Indian
- Notable awards: Wrangler Award (1988); Hartwick College Honorary degree (1991)

Frederick J. Dockstader (February 3, 1919 – March 21, 1998) was an Oneida-Navajo anthropologist and author who specialized in the study of Indigenous American artwork.

== Early life and career ==
Dockstader was born in Los Angeles, California. Growing up, he split his time between the Navajo Nation and the Hopi Reservation. He earned an undergraduate degree and a master's degree in 1939 and 1941, respectively, from Arizona State College at Flagstaff (now Northern Arizona University) and earned his doctorate at Case Western Reserve University. He married Alice Warren, an architect, in 1951.

Dockstader started his career as a sixth-grade teacher in Flagstaff, Arizona and eventually joined the Cranbrook Institute of Science as an ethnologist in 1950. Two years later he became Dartmouth College's curator of anthropology.

== Dismissal and later career ==
In 1976, Dockstader was fired from his position as director of the Museum of the American Indian after an investigation by the New York Attorney General's Office determined that he had engaged in a scheme with talk show host Dick Cavett to overvalue artifacts donated to the museum by Cavett, in one instance, nearly doubling his valuation of some gifts. Dockstader later admitted that he had engaged in the selling and trading of artifacts but claimed he had only done so because the museum's funding was inadequate. After his dismissal, Dockstader became a professor at The New School.

In 1991 he received an honorary degree from Hartwick College.

== Works and publications ==
While working at Dartmouth, he published his first book, a modified version of his doctoral dissertation aimed at a general audience entitled The Kachina and The White Man. In the book, Dockstader examined the Hopi practice of carving kachina dolls (wooden dolls with spiritual significance) and attempted to trace the influence European colonists had on the practice's evolution. In 1955 he began working at the Museum of the American Indian and was made the center's director in 1960. He was also Chairman of the Indian Arts and Crafts Board for some time.

Dockstader's second book, Indian Art in America: The Arts and Crafts of the North American Indian, was published in 1961. It received positive reviews in the Chicago Tribune and The Sacramento Bee, with the former describing it as "a reflection of the awakening interest in the art of primitive societies" and the latter praising Dockstader for his analysis of how colonialism destroyed many examples of Native art. Subsequent printings renamed the book Indian Art in North America in order to accommodate two additional volumes: Indian Art in Middle America and Indian Art in South America.

In 1988, his book Song of the Loom: New Traditions in Navajo Weaving received the Wrangler Award for best western art book.

== Death ==
Dockstader died on March 21, 1998. His papers and research files are held by Northern Arizona University.
