= Frederick Kingsbury Curtis =

American lawyer

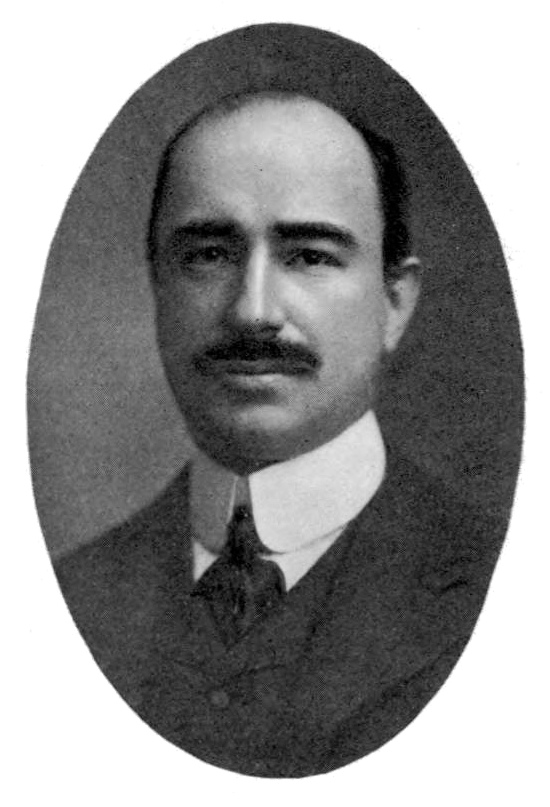
F. Kingsbury Curtis

Frederick Kingsbury Curtis I (February 3, 1863 – March 4, 1936) was an American lawyer and businessman, director of the Ann Arbor Railroad. He was secretary and treasurer, and a member of the board of directors of the United States & Porto Rico Navigation Company from 1903 to 1906.

In addition, he served on the board of trustees of the Heye Foundation, which was associated with the Museum of the American Indian, founded by George Gustav Heye in 1916 and based on his collection. It opened to the public in 1922.

Curtis married twice and had three daughters; the first, by his first wife, died in infancy. He had two daughters with his second wife. They both married and had their own families.

== Biography ==
Frederick Kingsbury Curtis was born on February 3, 1863, in New York City. He received his A.B. from Yale University in 1884, and became a member of the New York City Bar Association in 1886.

On October 28, 1890, he married Marian Scott Hare, the daughter of Mr. & Mrs. J. Montgomery Hare. Their daughter Mary Emlen Curtis died in infancy.

On June 14, 1905, he married Cornelia Day McLanahan (1873–1965) in Westminster, England. She was the daughter of George William McLanahan (1845–1908) and Helen Spencer Day (1848–1935). Their children were Helen Kingsbury Curtis, who married Herbert Pelham Curtis; and Cornelia McLanahan Curtis, who married Laurence M. Lombard.

He died in Venice, Florida, on March 4, 1936. On March 9, 1936, he was buried at Woodlawn Cemetery, the Bronx, New York.
