= George H. Pepper =

American ethnologist and archaeologist

George Hubbard Pepper (February 2, 1873 – May 13, 1924) was an American ethnologist and archaeologist. He worked on projects in New York, the Southwest and, most notably, the Nacoochee Mound in northeastern Georgia. His work with Frederick W. Hodge was sponsored by the Heye Foundation, Museum of the American Indian, and the Bureau of American Ethnology (now part of the Smithsonian Institution.)

== Biography ==
He was born in Tottenville, Staten Island, New York. Pepper conducted fieldwork starting in 1893, including archaeological digs at Burial Ridge, the largest pre-European burial ground in New York City. In 1895, he was contracted by the American Museum of Natural History in New York to continue his work at the site located in the Tottenville section of Staten Island.

From 1896 to 1900, Pepper led the excavation of the Pueblo Bonito great house in Chaco Canyon, New Mexico. His work there was supported by brothers B. Talbot Hyde and Frederick E. Hyde, Jr. of New York City and the American Museum of Natural History, New York.

In 1915, Pepper he traveled to Georgia to explore the Nacoochee Mound in the state's historic Cherokee region, on an excavation sponsored by the Heye Foundation, Museum of the American Indian and Bureau of American Ethnology. He conducted it with Frederick W. Hodge, in what is considered the first scientific archeological excavation in the state. They found an assortment of graves, including stone box graves; artifacts, and evidence of two villages associated with the platform mound, built in the Mississippian culture period. In 1918, George Gustave Heye, Hodge, and Pepper published their findings as The Nacoochee Mound Report (scanned copy available at the Internet Archive).

Pepper later returned to New York. He died at Roosevelt Hospital on May 13, 1924.
