= Pisgah phase =

Pre-Columbian culture in North America

The Pisgah phase (1000 to 1450/1500 CE) is an archaeological phase of the South Appalachian Mississippian culture (a regional variation of the Mississippian culture) in Southeast North America. It is associated with the Appalachian Summit area of southeastern Tennessee, Western North Carolina, and northwestern South Carolina in what is now the United States.

The historic Cherokee and Catawba peoples of this region were generally the ones to encounter European explorers and colonists, beginning in the mid-16th century. Some peoples of the South Appalachian Mississippian culture chiefdoms also encountered the Spanish expeditions. The Mississippian cultures are believed to have been ancestral to the Creek and Catawba in this area.

== Location ==
The archeological phase is applied to a 14,000 square miles (36,000 km^{2}) region in the South Appalachian geologic province. On the rim of the region during an earlier phase, the sites were occupied for rather short periods, with the interior of the region having sites occupied throughout the phase. Between about 1000 and 1250 CE, the region of northeastern Tennessee, Western North Carolina, and northwestern South Carolina was a sub-regional development of a local Woodland period population who incorporated characteristics from the larger Mississippian culture.

The villages ranged from about a quarter of an acre to 6 acres (24,000 m^{2}), with lesser complexity and a cultural pattern that does not compare in size to larger Mississippian sites that developed to the south and west of here. However, the Mississippian cultural pattern influence is seen in evidence from sites as far north as Lee County, Virginia, and south to Oconee County, South Carolina. The settlements in the South Appalachian area were characterized by construction of single earthen platform mounds at the center of the villages, rather than by larger complexes of multiple mounds and dense population.

The Pee Dee culture, primarily occupying territory in present-day North Carolina, expressed Pisgah cultural traits.

== Lifeways ==
=== Subsistence ===
Pisgah phase peoples, like other Mississippian-culture peoples, consumed a variety of wild animal and plant foods. They hunted the wooded uplands for white-tailed deer, bear, and wild turkey. But unlike their predecessors in the region, they also strongly relied on cultivation of maize agriculture. As much as half of their food was derived from agriculture. The rich bottomlands near their villages were planted with many staples of indigenous agriculture, including the Three Sisters (corn, beans, and squash/pumpkin), and sumpweed (Iva annua).

=== Architecture ===
Pisgah phase sites ranged from individual farmsteads to large nucleated villages surrounding platform mounds and defended by palisades. Usually the smaller sites were clustered around the larger centers that feature single mounds. These settlements were invariably located within floodplains; the only exceptions were temporary hunting camps. The majority of these sites are located in the Eastern and Central Appalachian Summit area, around the Asheville, Pigeon, and Hendersonville basins.

Some Pisgah phase sites, such as the Garden Creek Mound site, have been found to have had earth lodges constructed during early phases of their occupation. At times these earth lodges either collapsed or were destroyed, and a platform mound was constructed over them. Archaeologists interpret such a change as a shift in sociopolitical organization and community hierarchy. They believe that the earth lodges were used as egalitarian council houses.

The construction of platform mounds, followed by building temples, residences, and sometimes mortuary structures on top of these, marked the development of a more stratified society with hereditary elites.

The houses of the Pisgah phase were about 20 feet (6.1 m) square and tended to be rectangular. Walls were of single set-post construction, with wattle and daub as a finishing material. Structures had interior support posts and interior partitions. Trenches were dug for an entry way, with rows of saplings arched over them and covered in wattle and daub for a tunnel-like effect. The floors had a raised hearth in the center. Around the houses within the palisade were common burials, fire pits, and clay deposits used for storage pits and some as fire pits. There is evidence of smaller structures near the houses which are thought to have been storage cribs for maize and sweat houses for ritual practices.

A larger council house fronted the homes surrounding the central plaza and opposite the village entrance. If the village had developed around an existing mound from the Mississippian period, typically the Cherokee built their townhouse on top of the earthen mound. The palisades had off-set entrances.

=== Burial ===
Three types of burials are associated with the Pisgah phase. The people used side-chamber pits, central-chamber pits, and simple pits. The bodies of high-ranking adults and infants were placed within the side-chamber location in a loose flexed position, with their heads toward the west. Remains from these burials show adult skulls with artificial cranial deformation, likely induced for cultural reasons. The adult graves also had such grave goods as shell ear pins, turtle-shell rattles, shell bowls, and perforated animal bones. The infants' grave objects included columella shell beads, shell gorgets, and perforated marginella shells. Included within certain graves in some sites that express a social ranking are stone, clay, bone, shell, and wood artifacts.

=== Ceramics ===
While William Henry Holmes of the Smithsonian Institution first identified Pisgah ceramics in 1884, it was not until the late 20th century that a detailed study of the pottery was completed. In 1966 Patricia Holden was the first to publish such an analysis of Pisgah pottery.

Pisgah phase pottery, unlike the vast majority of Mississippian culture pottery, used sand as a tempering agent instead of ground mussel shell. The pottery is typified by collared rims and rectilinear, complicated stamp decoration.

The designs are similar to northern Iroquois ceramics. The complicated stamping designs were found to be like Etowah of the Piedmont region and Hiwassee Island designs of the Ridge and Valley province. Bolder check stamping became a minority style. Some pottery had rectilinear motifs, and other works were curvilinear toward the end of the phase. For the most part, these styles of ceramics became more common after 1250 CE in the Blue Ridge basins of western North Carolina and northwestern South Carolina. The Qualla Phase pottery that followed is thought to have resulted from be the result of the merging of Lamar and Pisgah phases cultures about 1450 CE.

== Chronological position ==
The Pisgah phase is a part of the Southern Appalachian Summit Archaeology, which includes the following chronology:

- Archaic Period, ca. 7500–4300 BCE
- Morrow Mountain Phase, ca. 4300–2500 BCE
- Savannah River Phase, ca. 2500–750 BCE
- Swannanoa Phase, ca. 750~150 BCE
- Pigeon Phase, ca. 200 BCE–100 CE
- Connestee Phase, 150–1000 CE
- Pisgah phase, 1000-1500 CE
- Qualla Phase, ca. 1500 CE–1850 CE (historic Cherokee)

== Sites ==
Most Pisgah sites are found along the Catawba, French Broad, Hiwassee, Little Tennessee, and Pigeon rivers in North Carolina.

Specific sites include the following:

- Asheville
- Blair Mound, near Winnsboro, South Carolina
- Brunk Site, Buncombe County, North Carolina
- Garden Creek Mound (31HW1),
- Hendersonville
- McDowell Site (31MC41), in McDowell County, North Carolina
- Pigeon
- Ward site, Watauga County, North Carolina
- Warren Wilson site, at Warren Wilson University, east of Asheville
