= Frederic Kimber Seward =

American lawyer

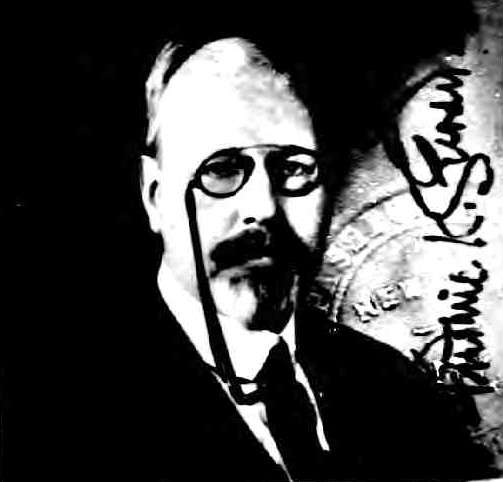
- Seward in 1925 passport application
- Born: March 23, 1878; Wilmington, Delaware, U.S.
- Died: December 7, 1943 (aged 65); New York City, U.S.
- Education: Columbia University; New York Law School
- Spouse: Sara Flemington Day

Frederic Kimber Seward Sr. (sometimes misspelled Frederick) (March 23, 1878 – December 7, 1943) was a prominent corporate lawyer in New York City. He was a passenger on the RMS Titanic, and later chaired a survivors' committee that honored the rescue ship RMS Carpathia.

== Biography ==
Seward was born on March 23, 1878, in White Star, Delaware, the son of Reverend Samuel Swezey Seward II (1838–1916) and Christina Frederika (Kimber) Seward (1837–1906). He had several siblings, among them a brother, John Perry Seward, a homeopathic physician. He graduated from Columbia University in 1899 and was a member of its Glee Club. He married Sara Flemington Day (1878–1932) and had three children: Frederic K. Seward Jr. (1904–1967); Katharine Seward (1907–1982) and Samuel S. Seward III (1910–1989). He studied at New York Law School and in 1908, he started work at the law firm of Curtis, Mallet, Prevot & Colt in New York City. He served on the Board of Trustees of George Gustav Heye's Museum of the American Indian starting in 1916. During World War II he served on New York City's wartime rationing board.

Seward died of heart failure on December 7, 1943, in New York City.

== The Titanic disaster ==
Seward, returning from Europe on a business trip, was on board RMS Titanic when it struck an iceberg and sank on the night of April 14, 1912. At the time of impact, he was playing cards with William T. Sloper and Dorothy Gibson in the first class lounge. Seward survived the sinking, escaping in lifeboat 7, the first to leave the ship. Seward filed a joint lawsuit with other survivors against White Star Lines; he himself was legal counsel for a victim of the sinking, John Montgomery Smart, and worked on settling his estate. He also served as the chairman of a committee to honor the bravery of Captain Arthur Rostron of RMS Carpathia and his crew.
