= George Gustav Heye Center =

Museum in Manhattan, New York

George Gustav Heye Center National Museum of the American Indian
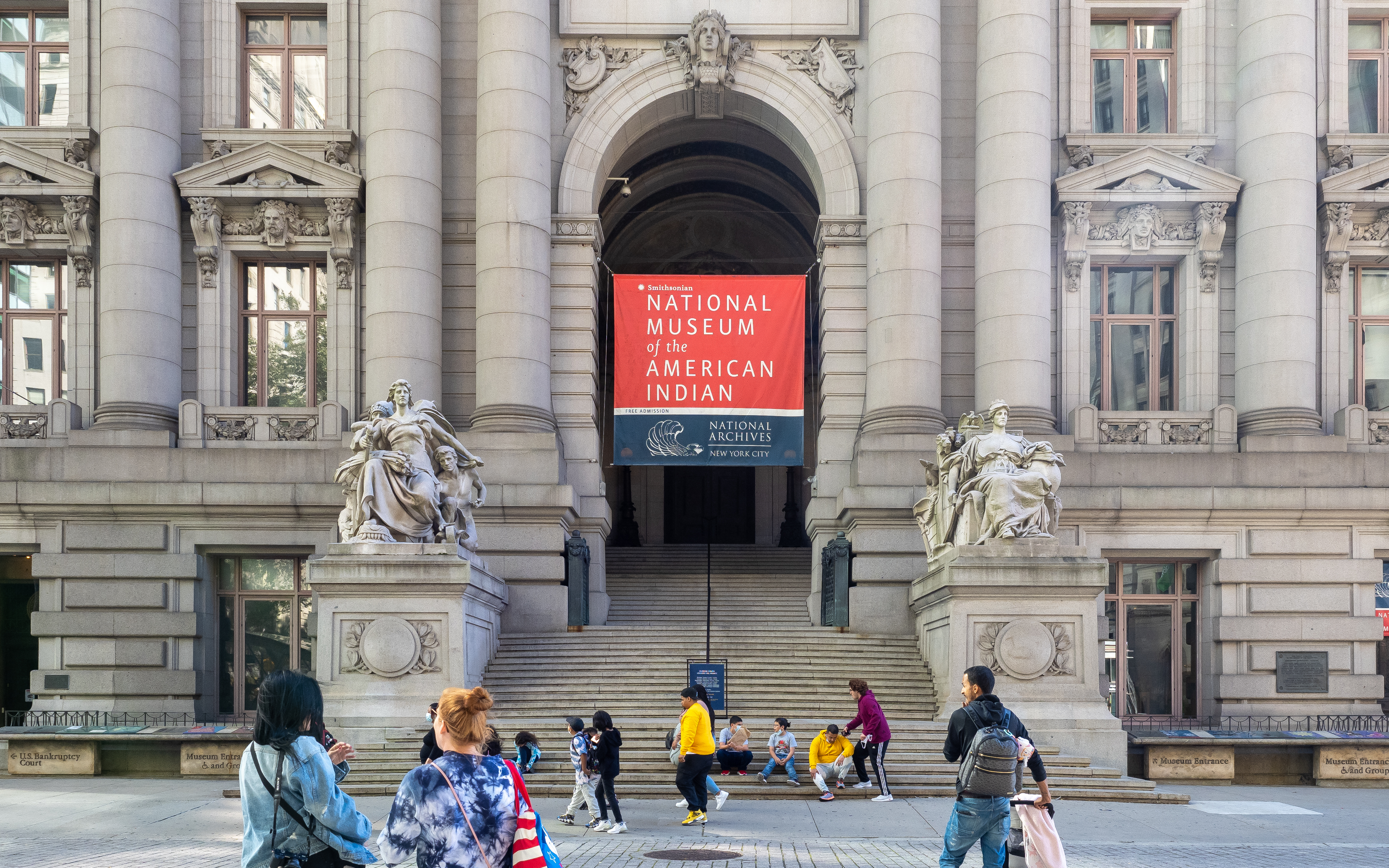
- Established: 1922
- Location: Alexander Hamilton U.S. Custom House, 1 Bowling Green, Manhattan, New York, United States
- Coordinates: 40°42′15″N 74°00′50″W
- Visitors: 239,435 (2022)
- Director: Cynthia Chavez Lamar
- Public transit access: New York City Bus: M9, M15, M15 SBS, M20, M55; New York City Subway: trains at Bowling Green or trains at South Ferry – Whitehall Street
- Website: americanindian.si.edu/visit/reopening-ny

The National Museum of the American Indian–New York, the George Gustav Heye Center, is a branch of the National Museum of the American Indian at the Alexander Hamilton U.S. Custom House in Manhattan, New York City. The museum is part of the Smithsonian Institution. The center features contemporary and historical exhibits of art and artifacts by and about Native Americans.

The center has its origin in the Museum of the American Indian founded by George Heye in 1916. It became part of the national museum and Smithsonian in 1987.

== History ==
The center is named for George Gustav Heye, who began collecting Native American artifacts in 1903. He founded and endowed the Museum of the American Indian in 1916, and it opened in 1922, in a building at 155th Street and Broadway, part of the Audubon Terrace complex, in the Sugar Hill neighborhood, just south of Washington Heights. Frederick J. Dockstader was director of the Museum from 1960 to 1976.

By early 1987, U.S. senator Daniel Patrick Moynihan was proposing legislation that would turn over the Alexander Hamilton U.S. Custom House, on Bowling Green in Lower Manhattan, to the Museum of the American Indian. For the past ten years, the museum had wished to relocate because its Upper Manhattan facility was insufficient, and the Custom House was being offered as an alternative for the museum's possible relocation to Washington, D.C. Mayor Ed Koch and U.S. senator Al D'Amato were initially opposed to Moynihan's plan, but dropped their opposition by August 1987. U.S. senator Daniel Inouye introduced the National Museum of the American Indian Act the next month, which would have instead merged the museum's collection with that of the Smithsonian Institution in Washington, D.C. A compromise was reached in 1988, in which the Smithsonian would build its own museum in Washington, D.C. The Smithsonian would also acquire the Heye collection, which it would continue to operate in New York City at the Custom House. The act was passed in 1989.

The George Gustav Heye Center opened in the Custom House in 1994. The Beaux Arts-style building, designed by architect Cass Gilbert, was completed in 1907 and is both a National Historic Landmark and a New York City designated landmark. In 2006, a renovation project reworked space on the ground floor into the Diker Pavilion, adding approximately 6,000 square feet (560 m^{2}) of space available for public display and events. The center's exhibition and public access areas total about 20,000 square feet (1,900 m^{2}). The Heye Center offers a range of exhibitions, film and video screenings, school group programs and living culture presentations throughout the year.

== Galleries ==
The permanent collection of the Heye Center is called Infinity of Nations, and is designed to show the scope of the Smithsonian's collection. Organized by geographic regions (including Central and South America), the exhibit displays over 700 items and crosses the line from ethnology to art. Multimedia interactions include audio and video, and feature commentary by historians on specific objects.

The rotunda on the second floor is frequently used as a performance space, and features murals reflecting the history of the building, done by Reginald Marsh.

Other galleries include the Photography Gallery, Special Exhibit Galleries, Contemporary Galleries, the Haudenosaunee Discovery Room, the Resource Center Reference Library, a small theater (which screens daily films), and the museum store.

The ground floor of the building houses the Diker Pavilion for Native Arts and Culture and the imagiNATIONS Activity Center, opened in 2018. The former education center was colloquially known as "The Tipi Room".

== Past exhibits ==
- Beauty Surrounds Us (September 23, 2006 – March 31, 2011), the inaugural exhibit for Diker Pavilion.
- A Song for the Horse Nation (November 14, 2009 – July 7, 2011), addressed the importance of the horse since its introduction to the Western Hemisphere in 1493.
- Hide: Skin as Material and Metaphor (September 4, 2010 – January 16, 2011), a multifaceted look at race and representation.
- Grab (January 29, 2011 – July 31, 2011), A photo exhibit celebrating the Grab Day tradition in Laguna Pueblo, New Mexico.
- Preston Singletary: Echoes, Fire, and Shadows (March 19, 2011 – September 5, 2011), Tlingit myths and legends represented in glass sculpture.
- Carl Beam (October 29, 2011 – April 15, 2012) Contemporary culture and colonialism juxtaposed in the work of an Ojibwe master artist. Featured The North American Iceberg, which the National Gallery of Canada acquired to begin their collection of contemporary Native art.
- Identity by Design (September 26, 2008 – February 7, 2010), Dresses and accessories which highlighted the traditions and identities of Native American women.
- Andrea Carlson (June 13, 2009 – January 10, 2010), Narrative story objects which reflected the cultural consumption that museum visitors engage in.
- Annie Pootoogook (June 13, 2009 – January 10, 2010), 39 drawings from a 2006 Inuit Sobey Art Award winner depicting the Canadian North.
- Ramp it Up: Skateboard Culture in Native America (December 11, 2009 – June 27, 2010), Celebrated the culture of skateboarding, graphic design, film-making, music, and Native entrepreneurship.
- Fritz Scholder: Indian/Not Indian (November 1, 2008 – May 17, 2009), Paintings, drawings, and sculptures, focusing on the Luiseno artist's 1980s and 1990s work, when he pursued non-Indian subject matter; controversial pieces from his 1960s and 1970s work were exhibited in the Washington DC facility.
- Listening to Our Ancestors (September 12, 2007 – July 20, 2008), Over 400 objects representing Native life, and the relationship between tradition and change, on the North Pacific coast.
- Norval Morrisseau: Shaman Artist (October 20, 2007 – January 20, 2008), Overlapping themes of Shamanism and Catholicism were expressed in the contemporary living art of this highly influential Anishnaabe artist.
- The museum created a virtual tour with the 4 Directions Project, engaging Native American youth with the exhibits Creation's Journey and All Roads Are Good, which is available online. Students selected items from the collection, created 3D panorama QuickTime objects, and wrote essays which were used as HTML tags. The Washington DC facility later emulated what was done in New York with students from Weedon Island, creating a virtual tour of objects relevant to their interests and cultural heritage.

== Image gallery ==
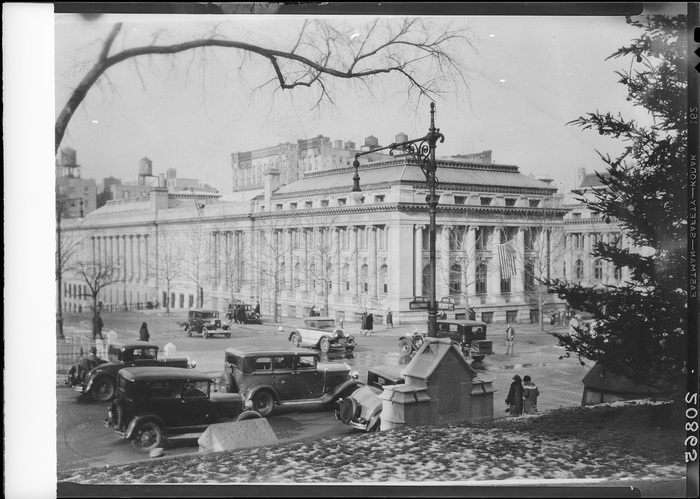
Original building at Audubon Terrace, photographed around the time of its opening in 1922

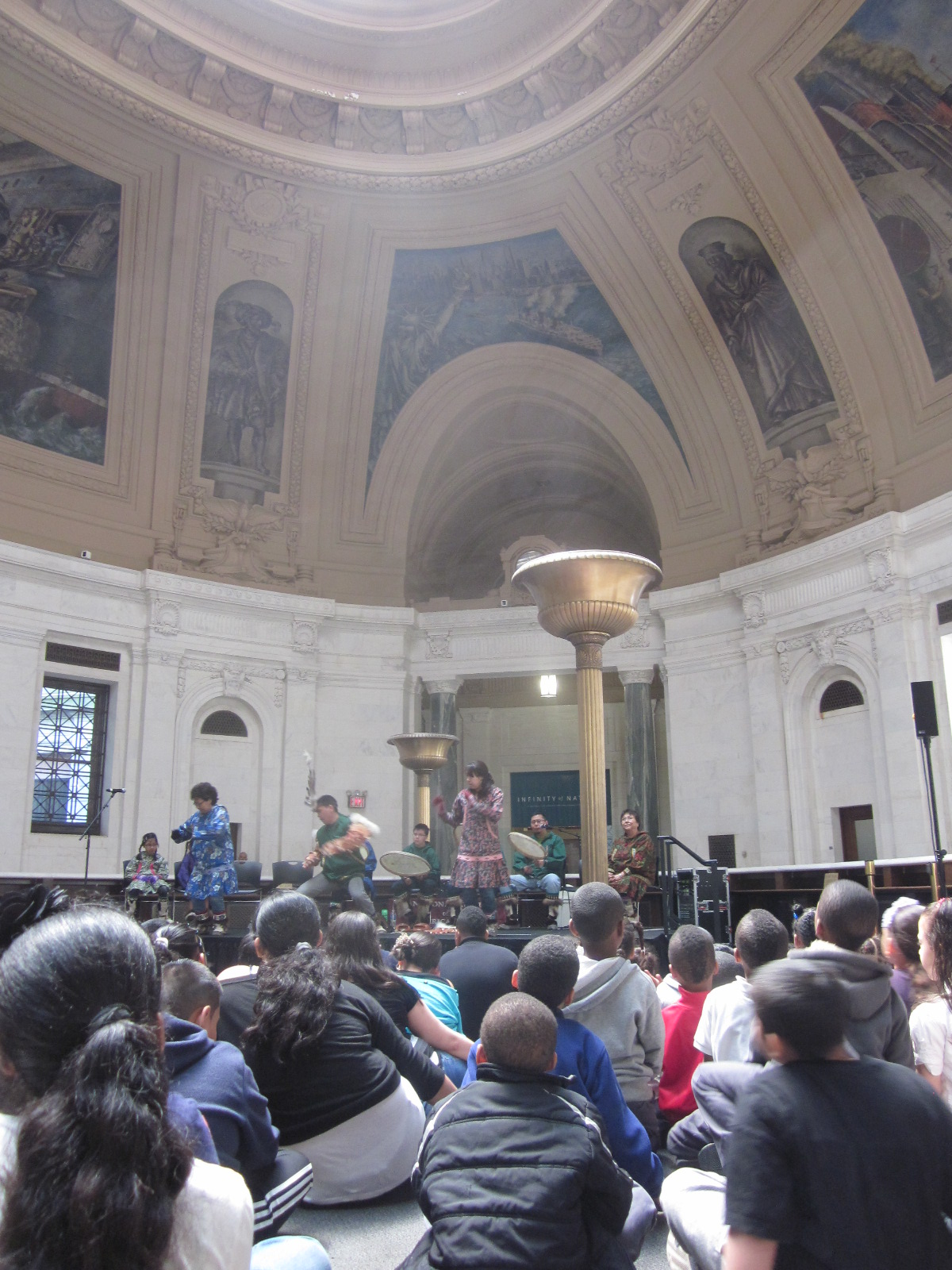
Rotunda of the current building, the Alexander Hamilton U.S. Custom House, during a live presentation (2012)

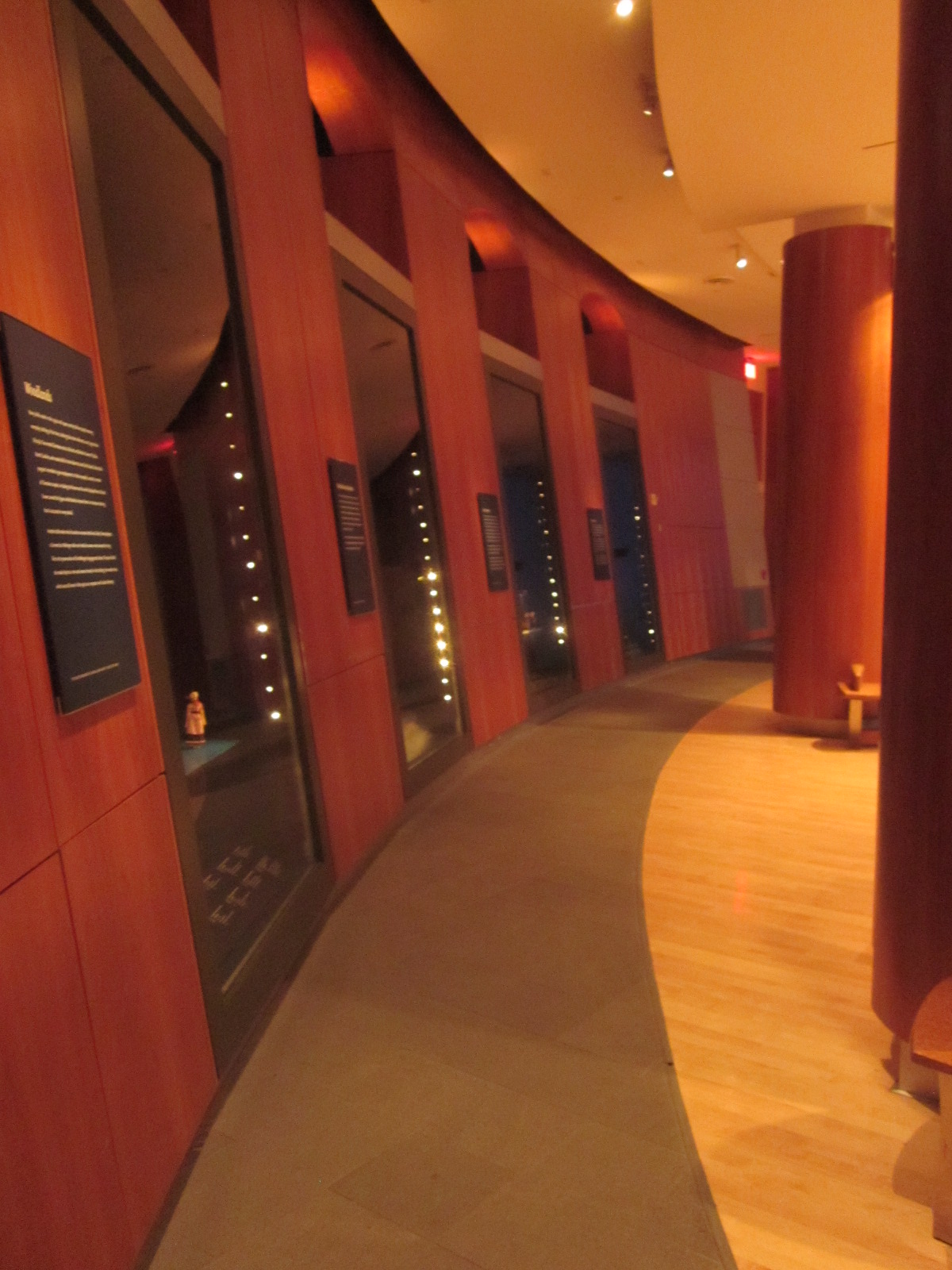
Diker pavilion (2012)

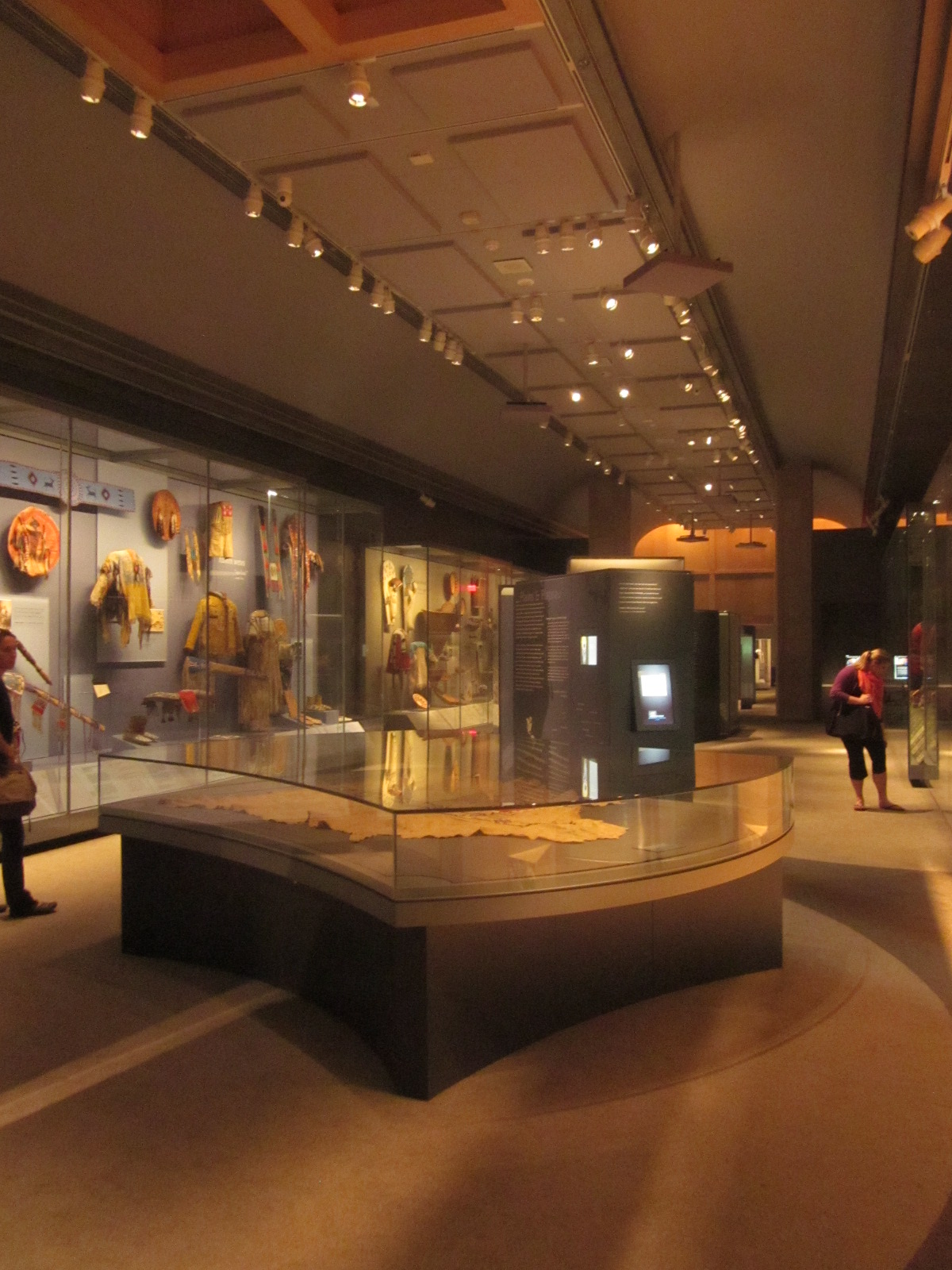
Infinity of Nations (2012)

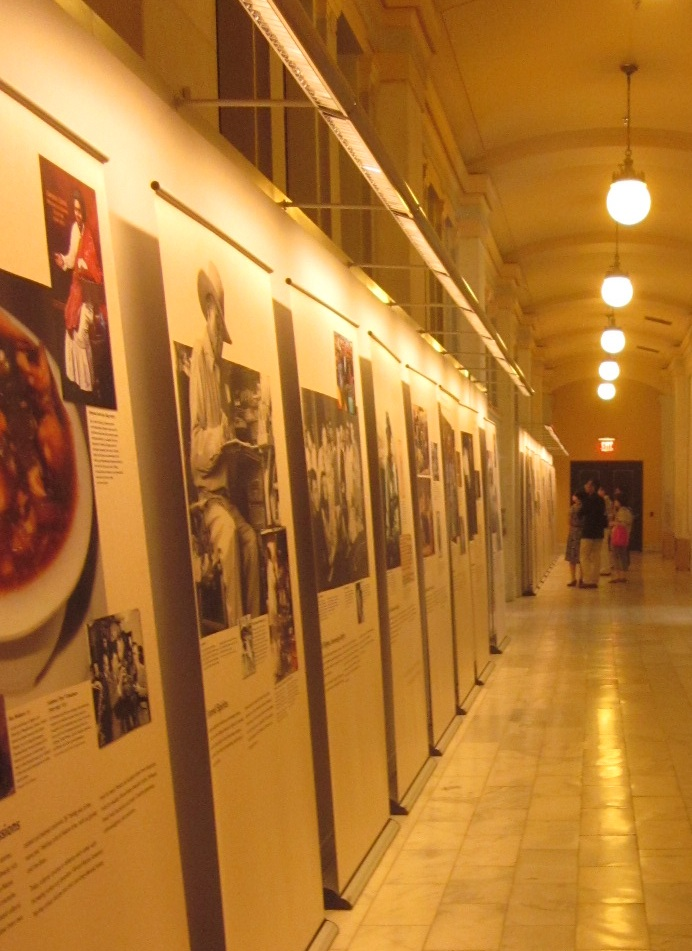
Photography Gallery (2012)

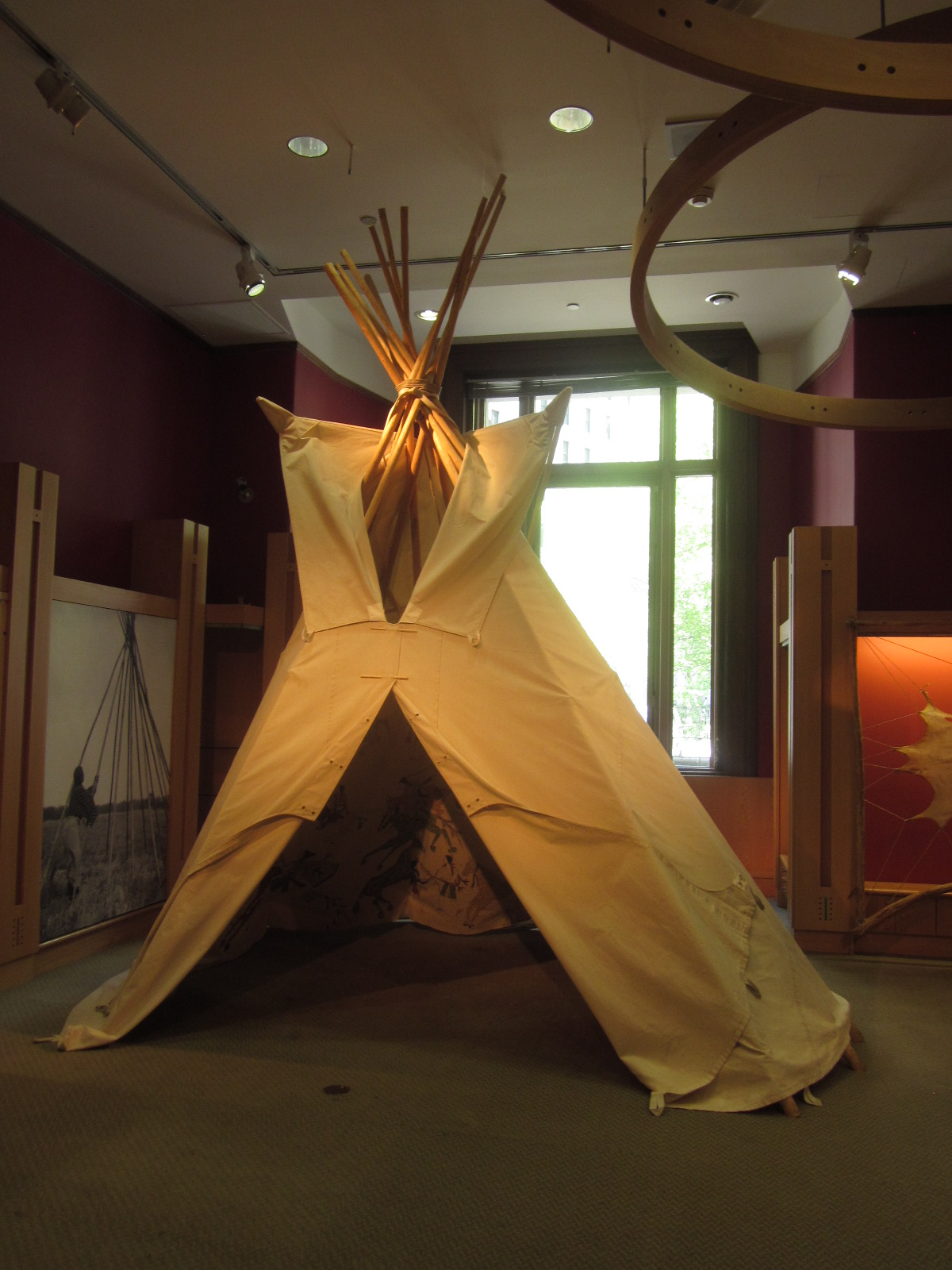
The Tipi Room (2012)
