= Appalachia =

Mountainous region in eastern North America

- Region
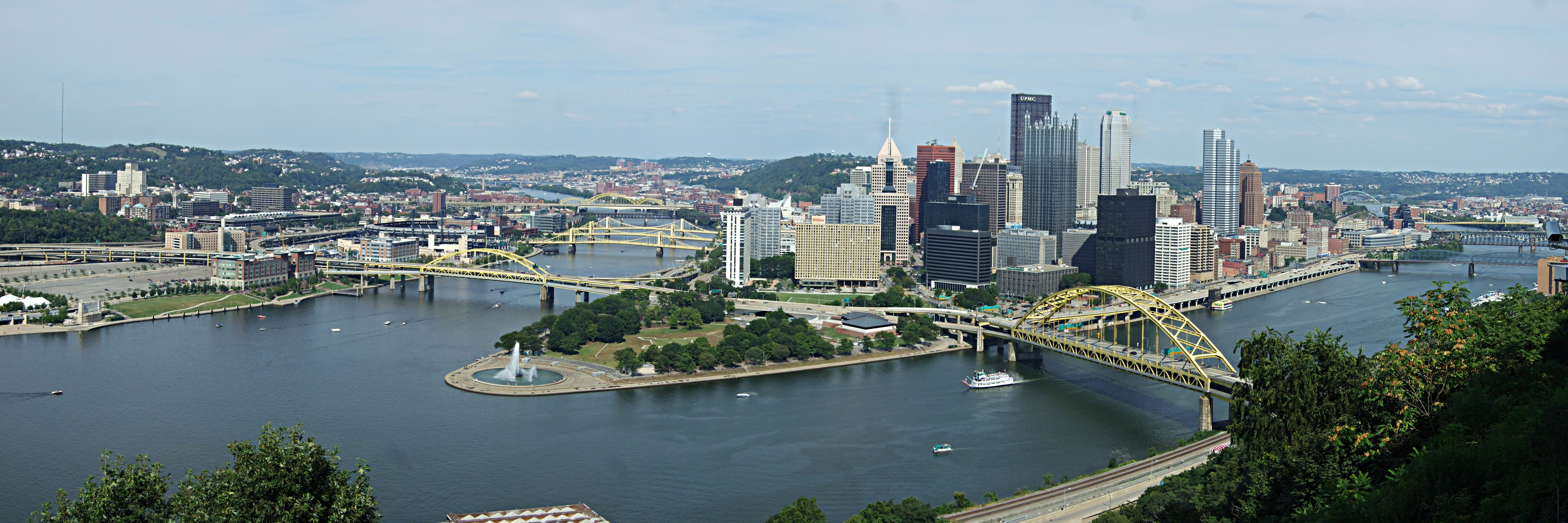
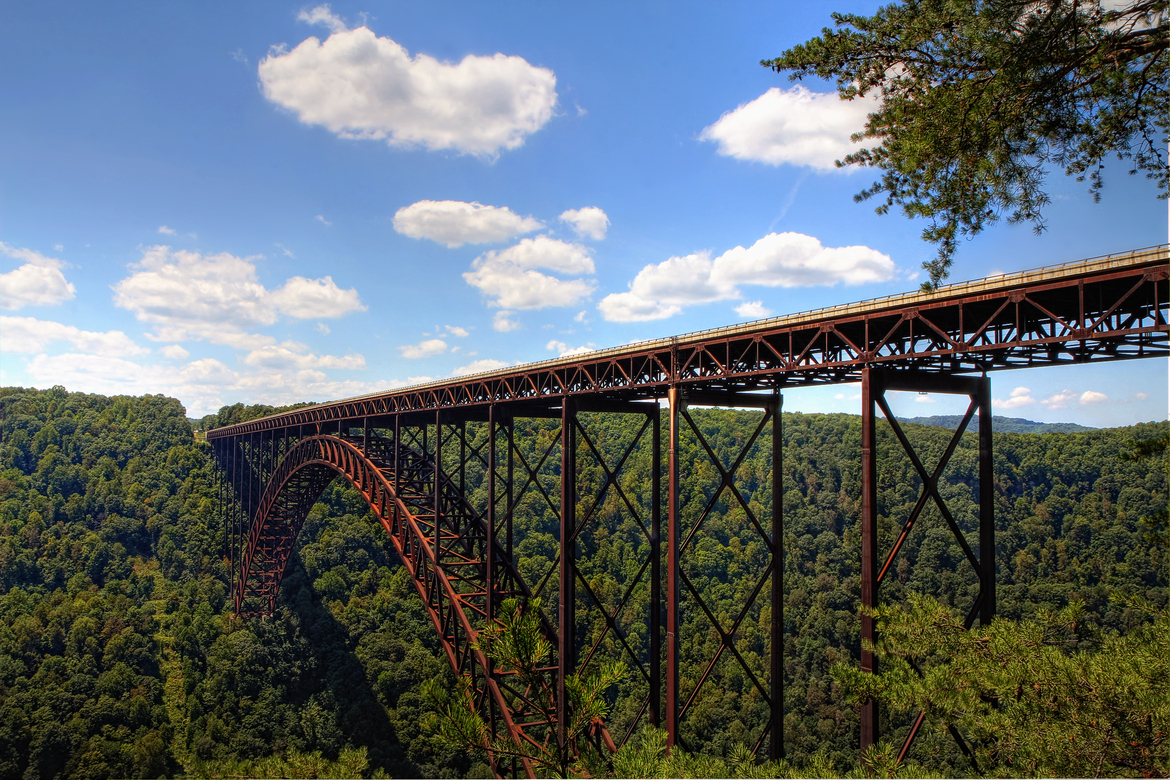
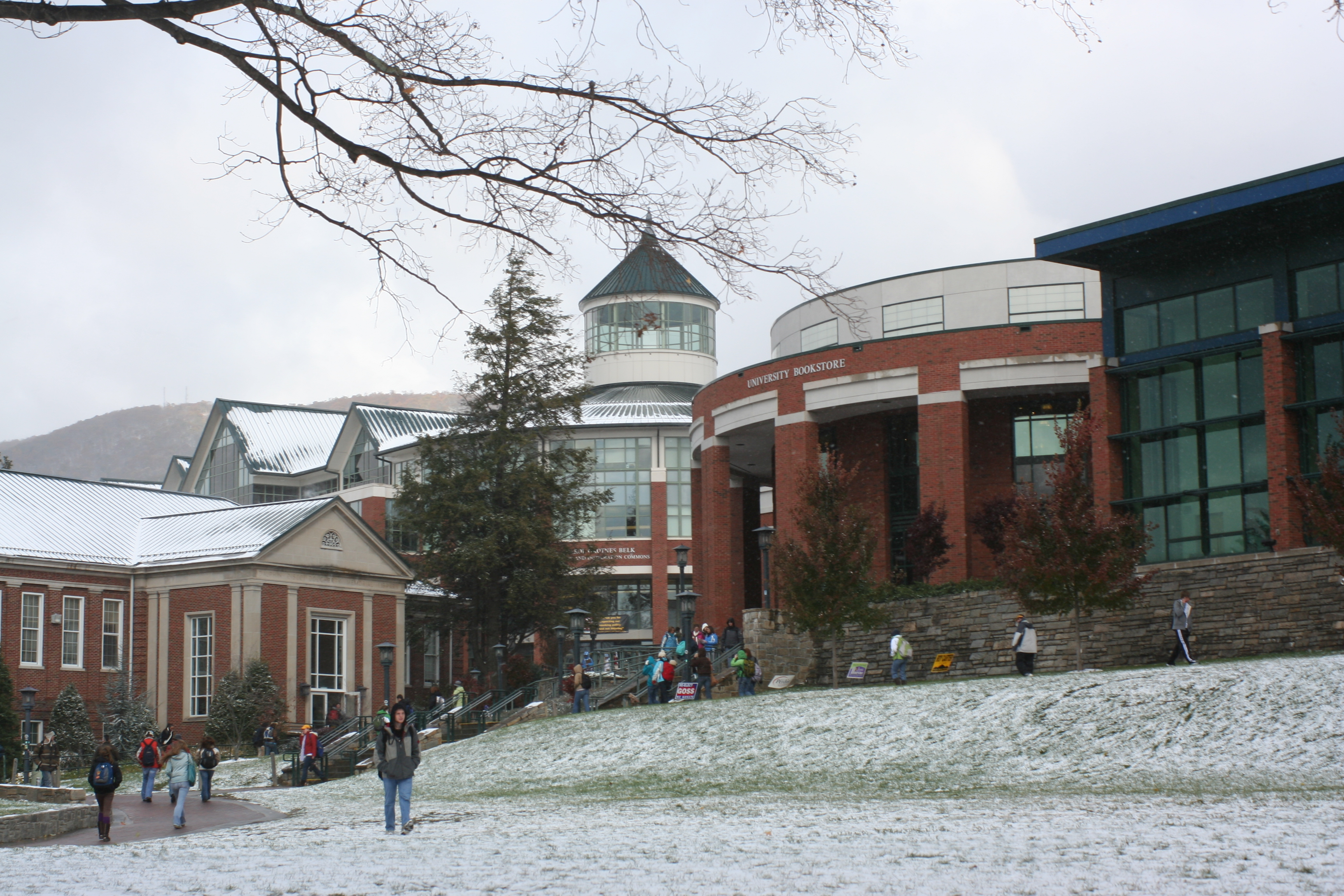
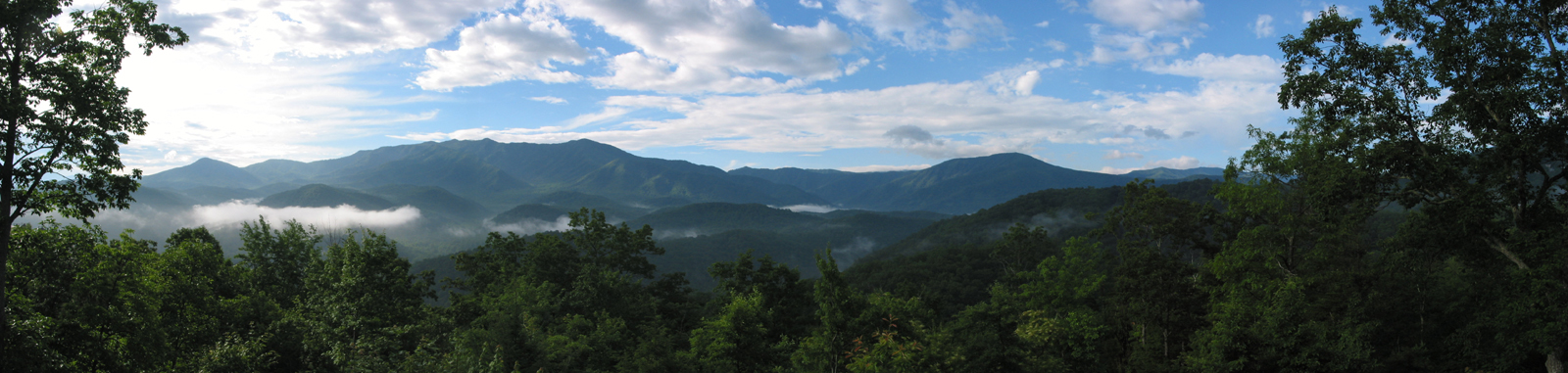
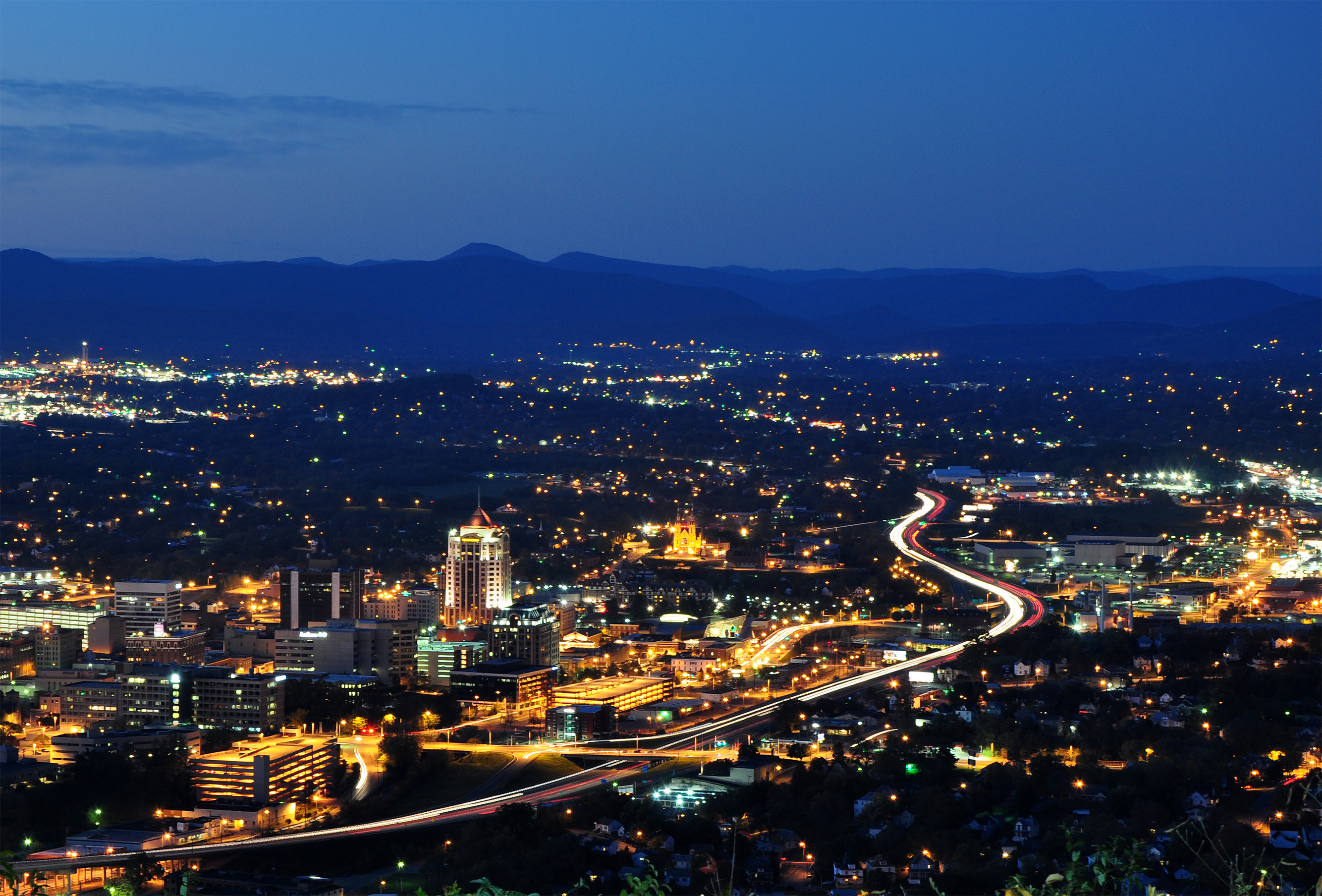
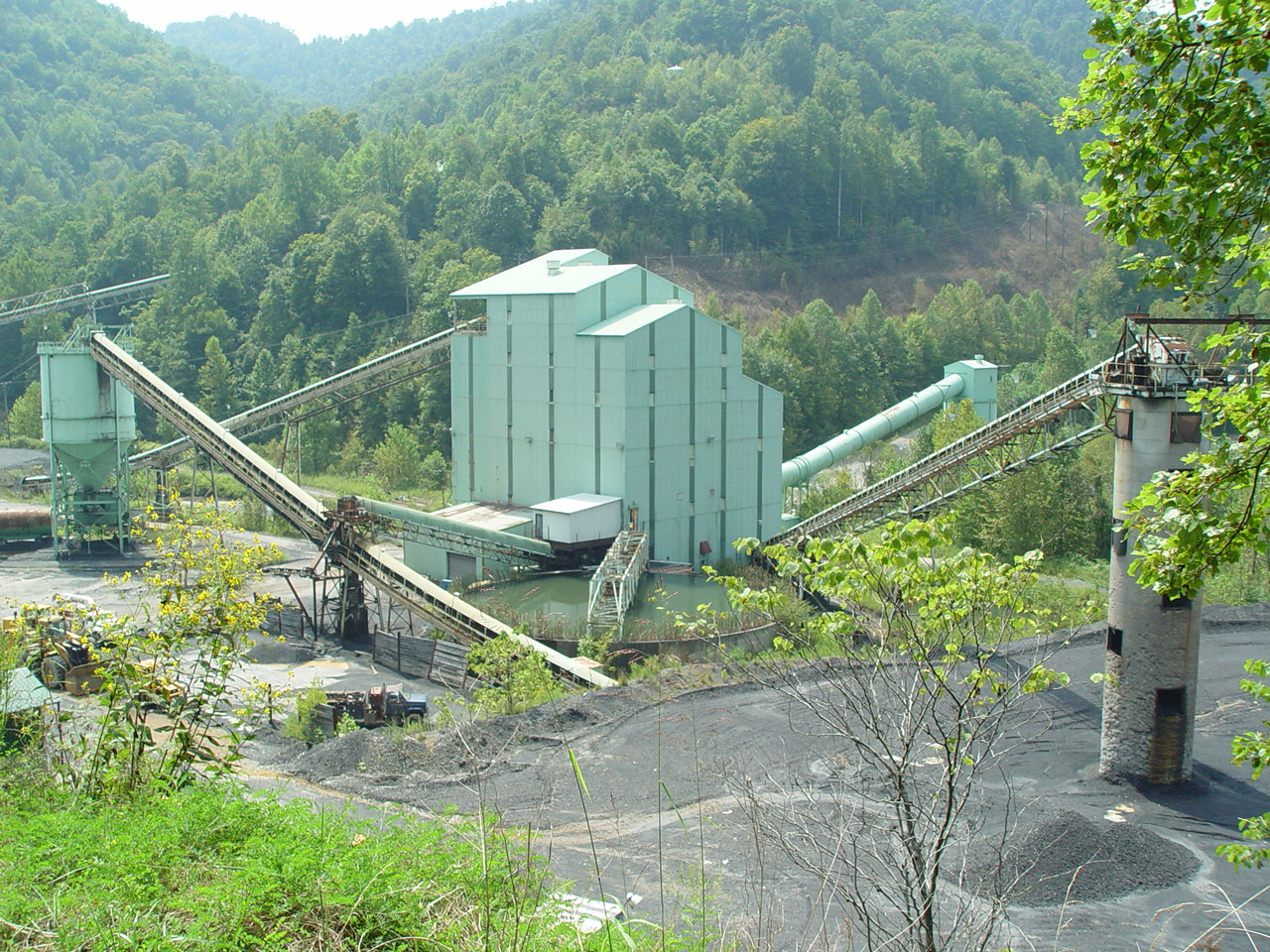
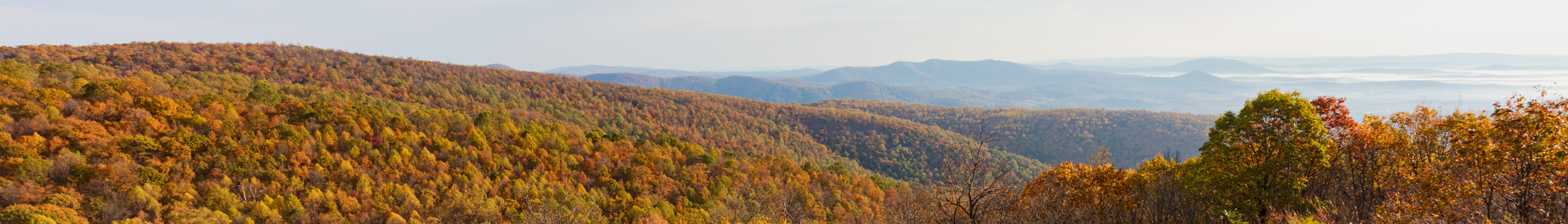
- Left–right from top: Pittsburgh skyline; New River Gorge Bridge; campus of Appalachian State University; Smoky Mountains; Roanoke skyline; Coal wash plant in the Eastern Kentucky Coalfield; view from the Appalachian Trail

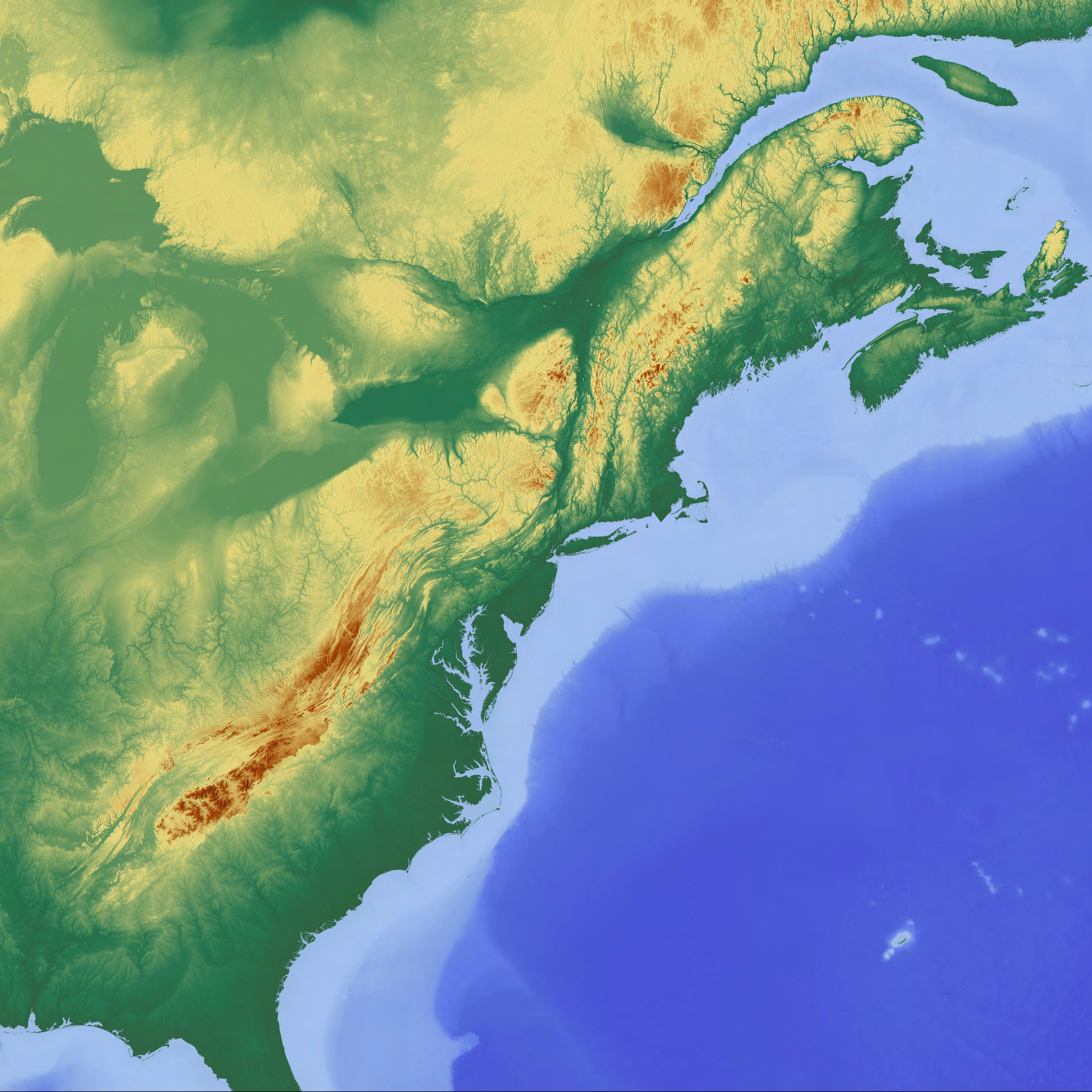
- Elevation map of the Appalachian mountains Lighter red counties form the Appalachian Regional Commission; dark red counties roughly make up "Old Appalachia".
- Coordinates: 38.80°N 81.00°W
- Country: United States of America and Canada
- Counties or county-equivalents: 420
- States: 13
- Largest city: Pittsburgh

Area
  - Total: 206,000 sq mi (530,000 km^{2})

Population (2023)
  - Total: 26.6 million (Appalachian Regional Commission estimate)
  - Density: 127.7/sq mi (49.3/km^{2})
- Demonym(s): Appalachian, Affrilachian
- Languages: English variants: Appalachian; American Indian; Western Pennsylvanian; Southern; Affrilachian; Ebonics; Black English; Ogwehoweh: Cherokee; Erie †; Susquehannock †; Siouan-Catawban: Tutelo; Catawba; Algonquian: Shawnee; Muskogean: Koasati (historically); Muscogee; Amerindian Isolates: Yuchi

Appalachia (/ˌæpəˈlætʃə/ AP-ə-LATCH-ə or /ˌæpəˈleɪtʃə/ AP-ə-LAY-chə) is a geo-cultural region located in the Appalachian Mountains in the east of North America. West Virginia, located near the center, is the only state entirely within the boundaries of Appalachia. While its geographic boundaries stretch as far north as New Brunswick and Newfoundland, Canada, the Appalachian Regional Commission's (ARC) borders begin in the Southern tier of New York and continue south through the Blue Ridge Mountains and Great Smoky Mountains into northern Georgia, Alabama, and Mississippi. The cultural area that has been traditionally perceived as Appalachia, also known as "Old Appalachia", is generally defined as a subregion inside of the ARC's boundaries. In 2021, the region was home to an estimated 26.3 million people.

Since its recognition as a cultural region in the late 19th century, Appalachia has been a source of enduring myths and distortions regarding the isolation, temperament, and behavior of its inhabitants. Early 20th-century writers often engaged in yellow journalism focused on sensationalistic aspects of the region's culture, such as moonshining and clan feuding, portraying the region's inhabitants as uneducated and unrefined; although these stereotypes still exist to a lesser extent today, sociological studies have since begun to dispel them.

Appalachia is endowed with abundant natural resources, but its residents have struggled economically due to systemic exploitation from outside industrialists and have long been associated with poverty. In the early 20th century, large-scale logging and coal mining firms brought jobs and modern amenities to Appalachia, but by the 1960s the region had failed to capitalize on any long-term benefits from these two industries. Beginning in the 1930s, the federal government sought to alleviate poverty in the Appalachian region with a series of New Deal initiatives, specifically the Tennessee Valley Authority (TVA). The TVA was responsible for the construction of hydroelectric dams that provide a vast amount of electricity and that support programs for better farming practices, regional planning, and economic development.

In 1965, the Appalachian Regional Commission was created to further alleviate poverty in the region, mainly by diversifying the region's economy and helping to provide better health care and educational opportunities to the region's inhabitants. By 1990, Appalachia had largely joined the economic mainstream but still lagged behind the rest of the nation in most economic indicators.

== Definitions ==
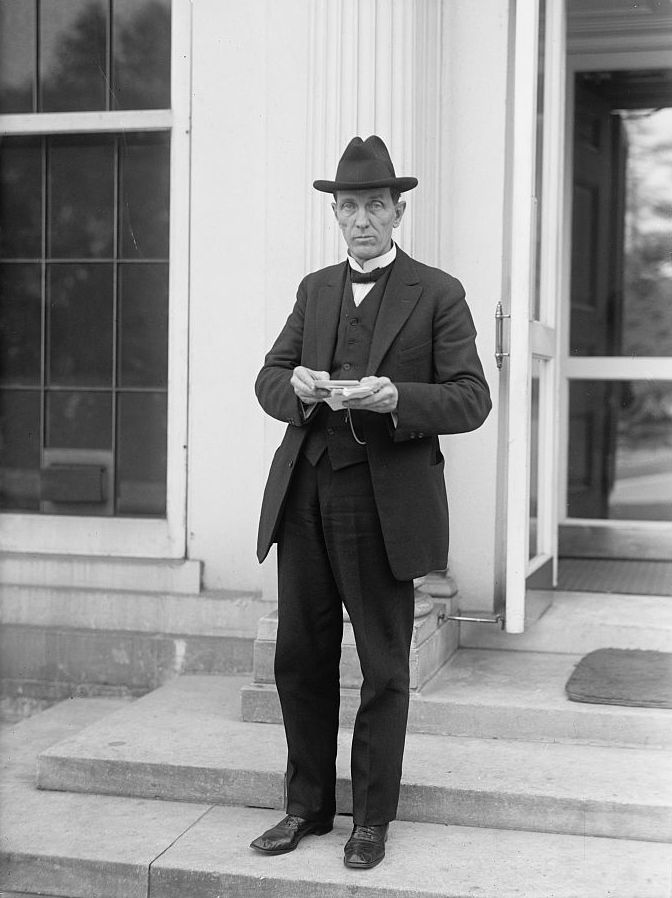
William G. Frost, an American scholar of the Greek language who has been credited with coining the phrase "Appalachian American".

Since Appalachia lacks definite physiographical or topographical boundaries, there has been some disagreement over what the region encompasses. The most commonly used modern definition of Appalachia is the one initially defined by the Appalachian Regional Commission (ARC) in 1965 and expanded over subsequent decades. The region defined by the commission includes 420 counties and eight independent cities in 13 states, including all 55 counties in West Virginia, 14 in New York, 52 in Pennsylvania, 32 in Ohio, 3 in Maryland, 54 in Kentucky, 25 counties and 8 cities in Virginia, 29 in North Carolina, 52 in Tennessee, 6 in South Carolina, 37 in Georgia, 37 in Alabama, and 24 in Mississippi. When the commission was established, counties were added based on economic need, however, rather than any cultural parameters.

The first major attempt to map Appalachia as a distinctive cultural region came in the 1890s with the efforts of Berea College president William Goodell Frost, whose "Appalachian America" included 194 counties in 8 states. In 1921, John C. Campbell published The Southern Highlander and His Homeland, in which he modified Frost's map to include 254 counties in 9 states. A landmark survey of the region in the following decade by the United States Department of Agriculture defined the region as consisting of 206 counties in 6 states. In 1984, Karl Raitz and Richard Ulack expanded the ARC's definition to include 445 counties in 13 states, although they removed all counties in Mississippi and added two in New Jersey. Historian John Alexander Williams, in his 2002 book Appalachia: A History, distinguished between a "core" Appalachian region consisting of 164 counties in West Virginia, Kentucky, Virginia, Tennessee, North Carolina, and Georgia, and a greater region defined by the ARC.

In the Encyclopedia of Appalachia (2006), Appalachian State University historian Howard Dorgan suggests the term "Old Appalachia" for the region's cultural boundaries, noting an academic tendency to separate the southwestern and northeastern extremes of the ARC's pragmatic definition. The term "Greater Appalachia" was introduced by American journalist Colin Woodard in his 2011 book, American Nations: A History of the Eleven Rival Regional Cultures of North America. Sean Trende, senior elections analyst at RealClearPolitics, defines "Greater Appalachia" in his 2012 book, The Lost Majority, as including both the Appalachian Mountains region and the Upland South, following Protestant Scotch-Irish migrations to the southern and Midwestern United States in the 18th and 19th centuries. The Upland South region includes the Ozark Plateau in Missouri, Arkansas, and Oklahoma, an area which is not included in the ARC definition.

=== Toponymy and pronunciation ===
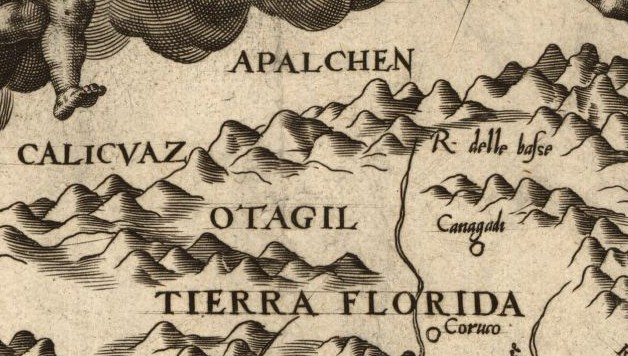
Detail of Gutierrez' 1562 map showing the first known cartographic appearance of a variant of the name "Appalachia"

While exploring inland along the northern coast of Florida in 1528, the members of the Narváez expedition, including Álvar Núñez Cabeza de Vaca, found a village of indigenous peoples near present-day Tallahassee, Florida, whose name they transcribed as Apalchen or Apalachen ([aˈpal(a)tʃen]). The name was altered by the Spanish to Apalache (Apalachee) and used as a name for the tribe and region spreading well inland to the north. Pánfilo de Narváez's expedition first entered Apalachee territory on June 15, 1528, and applied the name. Now spelled "Appalachian," it is the fourth oldest surviving European place-name in the U.S. After the de Soto expedition in 1540, Spanish cartographers began to apply the name of the tribe to the Appalachian Mountain range. The first cartographic appearance of Apalchen is on Diego Gutiérrez's 1562 map; the first use for the mountain range is the 1565 map by Jacques le Moyne de Morgues. Le Moyne was also the first European to apply "Apalachen" specifically to a mountain range as opposed to a village, Native tribe, or a southeastern region of North America.

The name was not commonly used for the whole mountain range until the late 19th century. A competing, and often more popular, name was the "Allegheny Mountains", "Alleghenies", and even "Alleghania".

In southern U.S. dialects, the mountains are called the /æpəˈlætʃənz/, and the cultural region of Appalachia is pronounced /ˈæpəˈlætʃ(i)ə/, both with a third syllable like the "la" in "latch". This pronunciation is favored in the "core" region in the central and southern parts of the Appalachian range. In northern U.S. dialects, the mountains are pronounced /æpəˈleɪtʃənz/ or /æpəˈleɪʃənz/. The use of northern pronunciations are controversial to some in the southern region. Despite not being in Appalachia, Appalachian Trail organizations in New England popularized the occasional use of the "sh" sound for the "ch" in northern dialects in the early 20th century.

== History ==
=== Early history ===
Native American hunter-gatherers first arrived in what is now Appalachia over 16,000 years ago. The earliest discovered site is the Meadowcroft Rockshelter in Washington County, Pennsylvania, which some scientists claim is pre-Clovis culture. Several other Archaic period (8000–1000 BC) archaeological sites have been identified in the region, such as the St. Albans site in West Virginia and the Icehouse Bottom site in Tennessee. The presence of Africans in the Appalachian Mountains dates back to the 16th century with the arrival of European colonists. Enslaved Africans were first brought to America during the 16th-century Spanish expeditions to the mountainous regions of the South. In 1526 enslaved Africans were brought to the Pee Dee River region of western North Carolina by Spanish explorer Lucas Vazquez de Ayllõn. Enslaved Africans also accompanied the expeditions of Fernando de Soto in 1540 and Juan Pardo in 1566, who both traveled through Appalachia.

The de Soto and Pardo expeditions explored the mountains of South Carolina, North Carolina, Tennessee, and Georgia, and encountered complex agrarian societies consisting of Muskogean-speaking inhabitants. De Soto indicated that much of the region west of the mountains was part of the domain of Coosa, a country centered around a village complex in northern Georgia. By the time English explorers arrived in Appalachia in the late 17th century, the central part of the region was controlled by Algonquian tribes (namely the Shawnee), and the southern part of the region was controlled by the Cherokee. The French based in modern-day Quebec also made inroads into the northern areas of the region in modern-day New York state and Pennsylvania. By the mid-18th century the French had outposts such as Fort Duquesne and Fort Le Boeuf controlling the access points of the Allegheny River and upper Ohio River valleys after exploration by Celeron de Bienville.

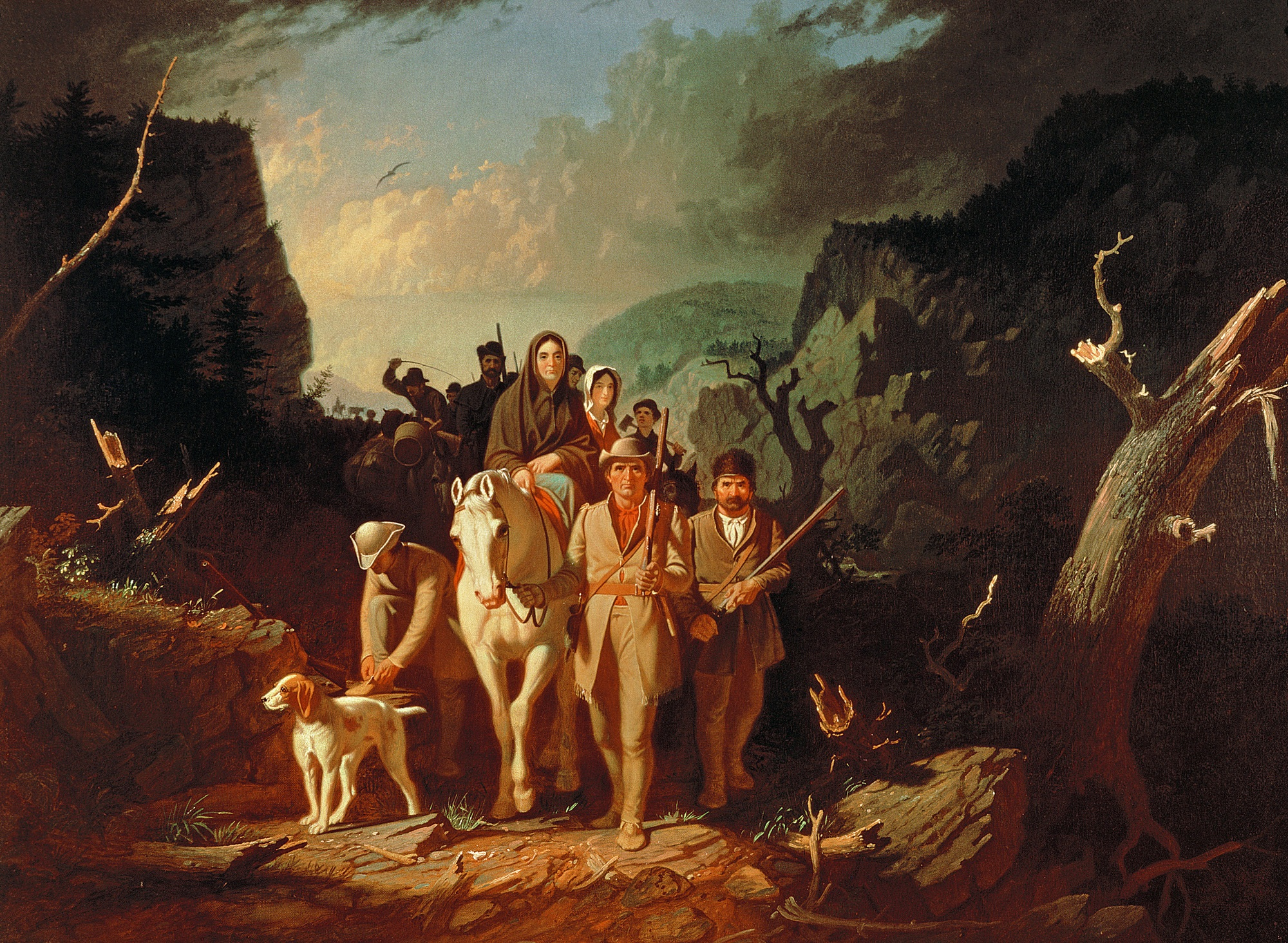
Daniel Boone Escorting Settlers through the Cumberland Gap (George Caleb Bingham, oil on canvas, 1851–52)

European migration into Appalachia began in the 18th century. As lands in eastern Pennsylvania, the Tidewater region of Virginia and the Carolinas filled up, immigrants began pushing further and further westward into the Appalachian Mountains. A relatively large proportion of the early backcountry immigrants were Ulster Scots—later known as "Scotch-Irish", a group mostly originating from southern Scotland and northern England, many of whom had settled in Ulster Ireland prior to migrating to America—who were seeking cheaper land and freedom from prejudice as the Scotch-Irish were looked down upon by other more powerful elements in society. Others included Germans from the Palatinate region and English settlers from the Anglo-Scottish border country. Between 1730 and 1763, immigrants trickled into western Pennsylvania, the Shenandoah Valley of Virginia, and western Maryland. Thomas Walker's discovery of the Cumberland Gap in 1750 and the end of the French and Indian War in 1763 lured settlers deeper into the mountains, namely to upper east Tennessee, northwestern North Carolina, upstate South Carolina, and central Kentucky.

During the 18th century, enslaved Africans were brought to Appalachia by European settlers of trans-Appalachia Kentucky and the upper Blue Ridge Valley. According to the first census of 1790, more than 3,000 enslaved Africans were transported across the mountains into East Tennessee and more than 12,000 into the Kentucky mountains. Between 1790 and 1840, a series of treaties with the Cherokee and other Native American tribes opened up lands in north Georgia, north Alabama, the Tennessee Valley, the Cumberland Plateau, and the Great Smoky Mountains. The last of these treaties culminated in the removal of the bulk of the Cherokee population (as well as Choctaw, Chickasaw and others) from the region via the Trail of Tears in the 1830s.

=== Appalachian frontier ===
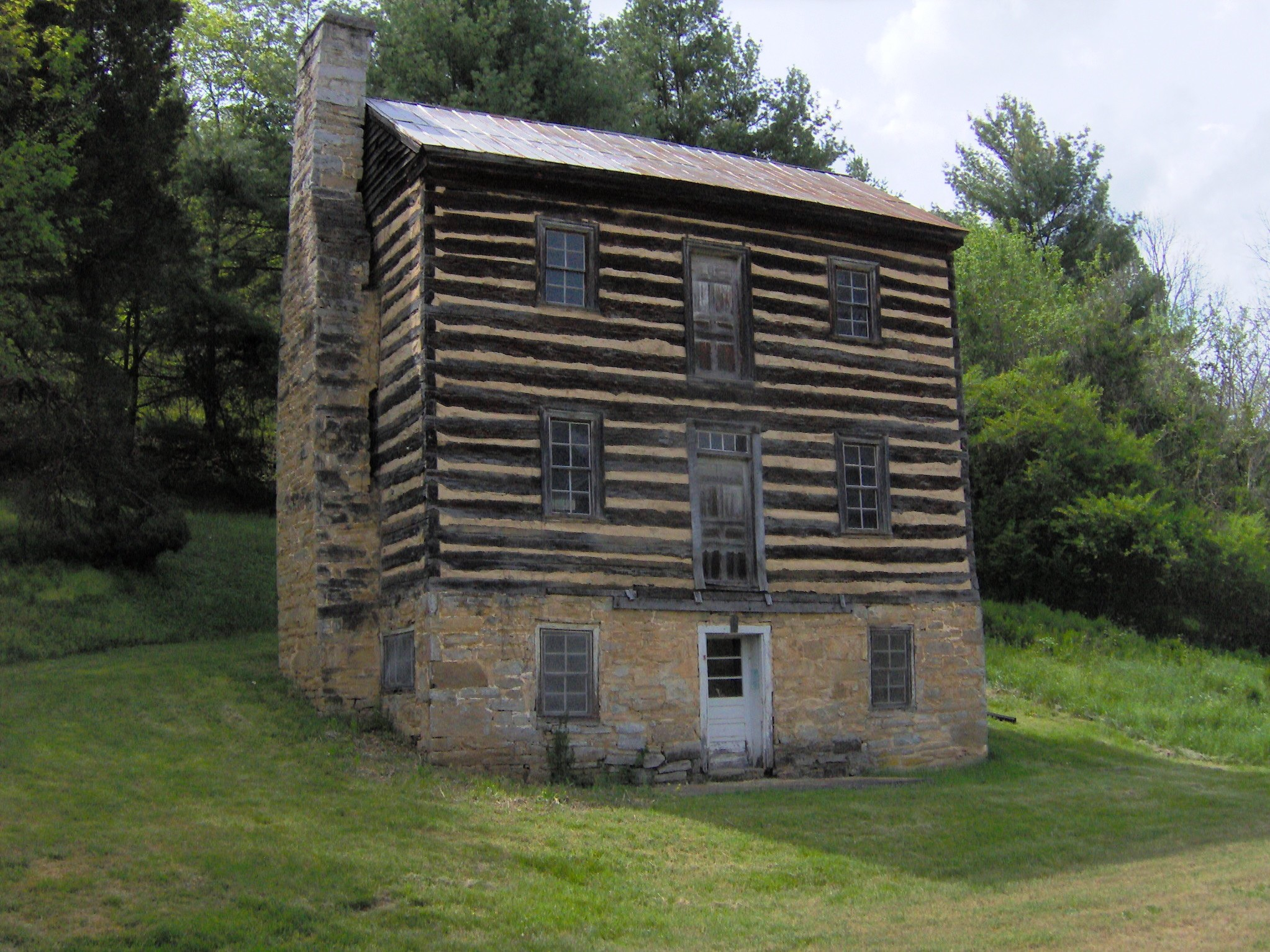
The Earnest Fort-house in Greene County, Tennessee. Built around 1782 during the Cherokee–American wars, it is located just south of Chuckey on the banks of the Nolichucky River.

Appalachian frontiersmen have long been romanticized for their ruggedness and self-sufficiency. A typical depiction of an Appalachian pioneer involves a hunter wearing a coonskin cap and buckskin clothing, and sporting a long rifle and shoulder-strapped powder horn. Perhaps no single figure symbolizes the Appalachian pioneer more than Daniel Boone, a long hunter and surveyor instrumental in the early settlement of Kentucky and Tennessee. Like Boone, Appalachian pioneers moved into areas largely separated from "civilization" by high mountain ridges and had to fend for themselves against the elements. As many of these early settlers were living on Native American lands, attacks from Native American tribes were a continuous threat until the 19th century.

As early as the 18th century, Appalachia (then known simply as the "backcountry") began to distinguish itself from its wealthier lowland and coastal neighbors to the east. Frontiersmen often argued with lowland and tidewater elites over taxes, sometimes to the point of armed revolts such as the Regulator Movement (1767–1771) in North Carolina. In 1778, at the height of the American Revolution, backwoodsmen from Pennsylvania, Virginia, and what is now Kentucky took part in George Rogers Clark's Illinois campaign. Two years later, a group of Appalachian frontiersmen known as the Overmountain Men routed British forces at the Battle of Kings Mountain after rejecting a call by the British to disarm. After the war, residents throughout the Appalachian backcountry—especially the Monongahela region in western Pennsylvania and antebellum northwestern Virginia (now the north-central part of West Virginia)—refused to pay a tax placed on whiskey by the new American government, leading to what became known as the Whiskey Rebellion. The resulting tighter federal controls in the Monongahela valley resulted in many whiskey/bourbon makers migrating via the Ohio River to Kentucky and Tennessee where the industry could flourish.

=== Early 19th century ===
In the early 19th century, the rift between the yeoman farmers of Appalachia and their wealthier lowland counterparts continued to grow, especially as the latter dominated most state legislatures. People in Appalachia began to feel slighted over what they considered unfair taxation methods and lack of state funding for improvements (especially for roads). In the northern half of the region, the lowland elites consisted largely of industrial and business interests, whereas in the parts of the region south of the Mason–Dixon line, the lowland elites consisted of large-scale land-owning planters. The Whig Party, formed in the 1830s, drew widespread support from disaffected Appalachians.

Tensions between the mountain counties and state governments sometimes reached the point of mountain counties threatening to break off and form separate states. In 1832, bickering between western Virginia and eastern Virginia over the state's constitution led to calls on both sides for the state's separation into two states. In 1841, Tennessee state senator (and later U.S. president) Andrew Johnson introduced legislation in the Tennessee Senate calling for the creation of a separate state in East Tennessee. The proposed state would have been known as "Frankland" and would have invited like-minded mountain counties in Kentucky, Virginia, North Carolina, Georgia, and Alabama to join it.

==== Proposal to rename the United States ====
In 1839 Washington Irving proposed to rename the United States "Alleghania" or "Appalachia" in place of "America", since the latter name belonged to Latin America too. Edgar Allan Poe later took up the idea and considered Appalachia a much better name than America or Alleghania; he thought it better defined the United States as a distinct geographical entity, separate from the rest of the Americas, and he also thought it did honor to both Irving and the natives after whom the Appalachian Mountains had been named. At the time, however, the United States had already reached far beyond the greater Appalachian region, but the "magnificence" of Appalachia Poe considered enough to rechristen the nation with a name that would be unique to its character. However, Poe's popular influence only grew decades after his death, and so the name was never seriously considered.

=== U.S. Civil War ===
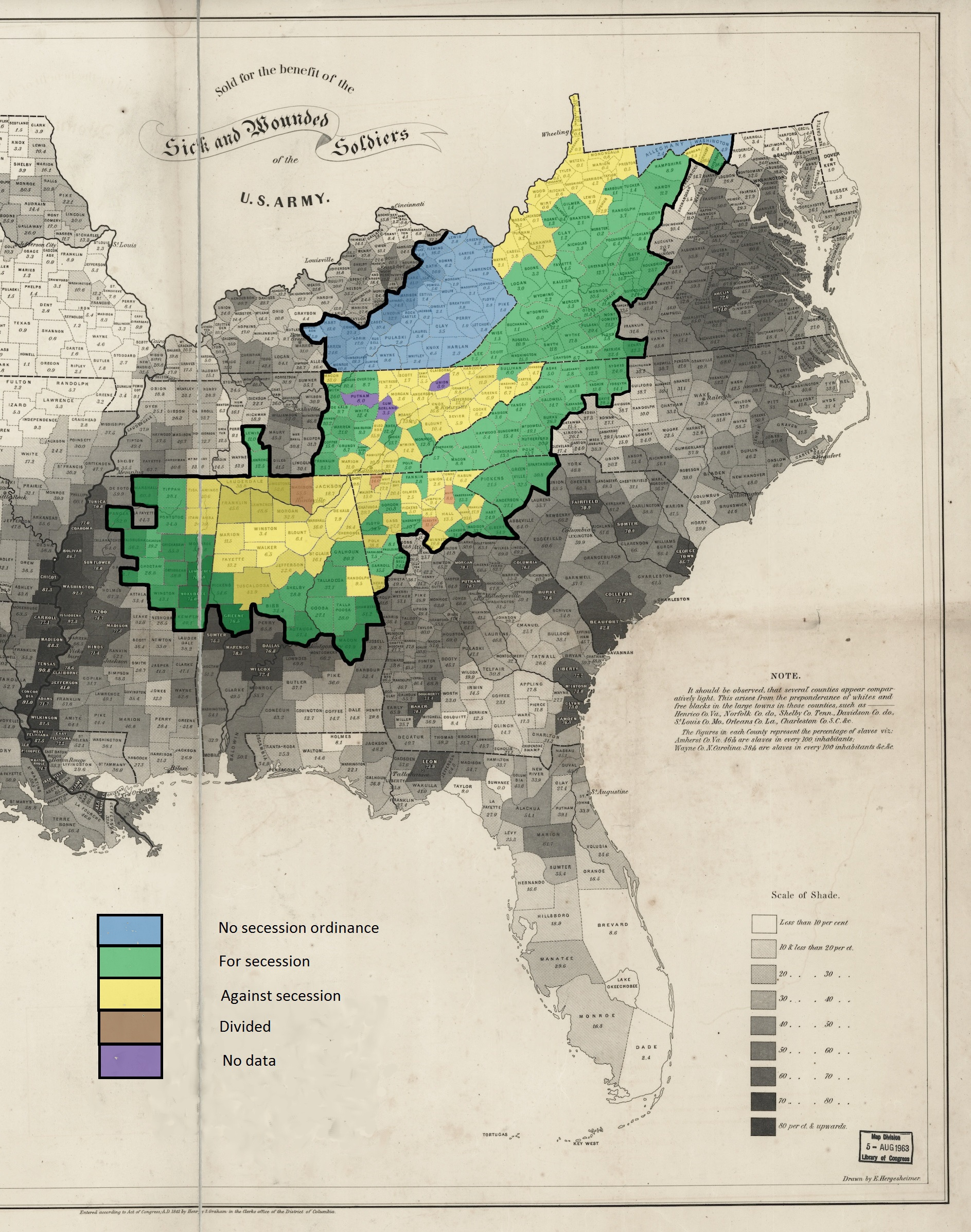
Map of the county secession votes of 1860–1861 in Appalachia within the ARC definition. Virginia and Tennessee show the public votes, while the other states show the vote by county delegates to the conventions.

By 1860, the Whig Party had disintegrated. Sentiments in northern Appalachia had shifted to the pro-abolitionist Republican Party. In southern Appalachia, abolitionists still constituted a radical minority, although several smaller opposition parties (most of which were both pro-Union and pro-slavery) were formed to oppose the planter-dominated Southern Democrats. As states in the southern United States moved toward secession, a majority of southern Appalachians still supported the Union. Though with opposition by Southern Unionists, middle and southern Appalachia became components of the Confederacy. In 1861, a Minnesota newspaper identified 161 counties in southern Appalachia—which the paper called "Alleghenia"—where Union support remained strong, and which might provide crucial support for the defeat of the Confederacy. However, many of these Unionists—especially in the mountain areas of North Carolina, Tennessee, Georgia, and Alabama—were "conditional" Unionists in that they opposed secession but also opposed violence to prevent secession, and thus when their respective state legislatures voted to secede, some would either shift their support to the Confederacy, or flee the state. Kentucky sought to remain neutral at the outset of the conflict, opting not to supply troops to either side. After Virginia voted to secede, several mountain counties in northwestern Virginia rejected the ordinance and with the help of the Union Army established a separate state, admitted to the Union as West Virginia in 1863 (on June 20, 1863). However, half the counties included in the new state, comprising two-thirds of its territory, were secessionist and pro-Confederate.

This caused great difficulty for the Unionist state government in Wheeling, both during and after the war. A similar effort occurred in East Tennessee. Still, the initiative failed after Tennessee's governor ordered the Confederate Army to occupy the region, forcing East Tennessee's Unionists to flee to the north or go into hiding. The one exception was the so-called Free and Independent State of Scott, though it was never recognized by either the Union or the Confederacy and thus would later be invaded by Confederates.

Both central and southern Appalachia suffered tremendous violence and turmoil during the Civil War. While there were two major theaters of operation in the region—namely the Shenandoah Valley and the Chattanooga area—much of the violence was caused by bushwhackers and guerrilla warfare. The northernmost battles of the war were fought in Appalachia with the Battle of Buffington Island and the Battle of Salineville resulting from Morgan's Raid. Large numbers of livestock were killed (grazing was an important part of Appalachia's economy), and numerous farms were destroyed, pillaged, or neglected. The actions of both Union and Confederate armies left many inhabitants in the region resentful of government authority and suspicious of outsiders for decades after the war.

=== Late 19th and early 20th centuries ===
==== Economic boom ====
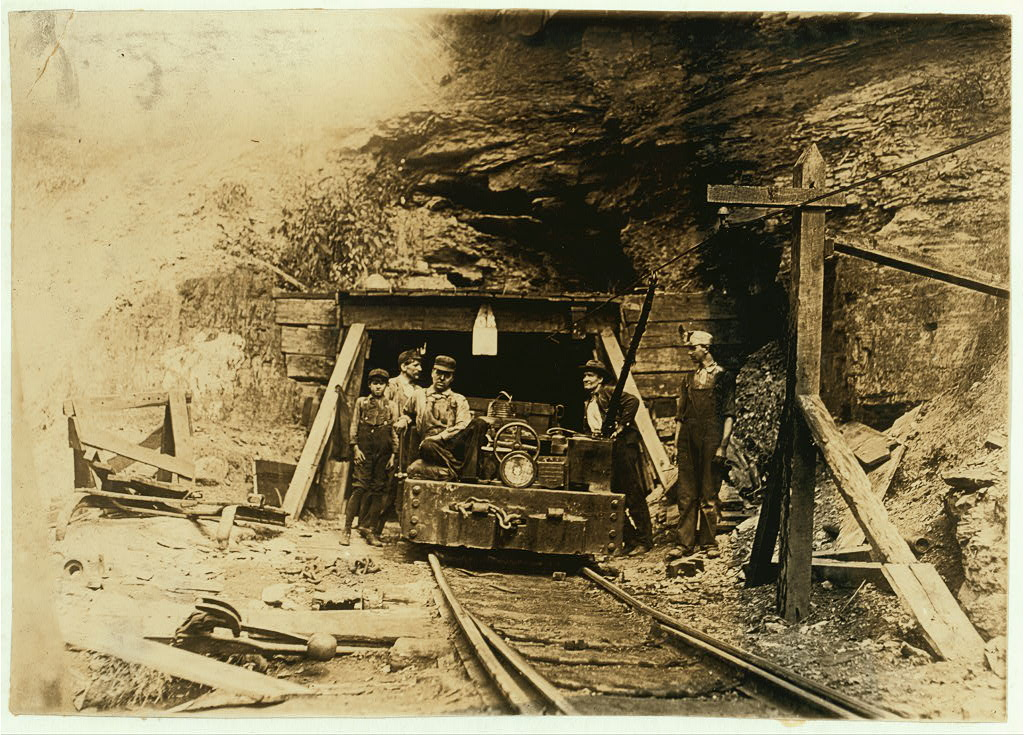
Entrance to mine shaft in West Virginia, photographed by Lewis Hine in 1908

After the Civil War, northern Appalachia experienced an economic boom. At the same time, economies in the southern region stagnated, especially as Southern Democrats regained control of their respective state legislatures at the end of Reconstruction. Pittsburgh as well as Knoxville grew into major industrial centers, especially regarding iron and steel production. By 1900, the Chattanooga area of north Georgia and northern Alabama had experienced similar changes with manufacturing booms in Atlanta and Birmingham at the edge of the Appalachian region. Railroad construction gave the greater nation access to the vast coalfields in central Appalachia, making its economy greatly dependent on coal mining. As the nationwide demand for lumber skyrocketed, lumber firms turned to the virgin forests of southern Appalachia, using sawmill and logging railroad innovations to reach remote timber stands. The Tri-Cities area of Tennessee and Virginia and the Kanawha Valley of West Virginia became major petrochemical production centers.

==== Stereotypes ====
The late 19th and early 20th centuries also saw the development of various regional stereotypes. Attempts by President Rutherford B. Hayes to enforce the whiskey tax in the late 1870s led to an explosion in violence between Appalachian "moonshiners" and federal "revenuers" that lasted through the Prohibition period in the 1920s. The breakdown of authority and law enforcement during the Civil War may have contributed to an increase in clan feuding, which by the 1880s was reported to be a problem across most of Kentucky's Cumberland region as well as Carter County, Tennessee; Carroll County, Virginia; and Mingo and Logan counties in West Virginia. Regional writers from this period such as Mary Noailles Murfree and Horace Kephart liked to focus on such sensational aspects of mountain culture, leading readers outside the region to believe they were more widespread than in reality. In an 1899 article in The Atlantic, Berea College president William G. Frost attempted to redefine the inhabitants of Appalachia as "noble mountaineers"—relics of the nation's pioneer period whose isolation had left them unaffected by modern times.

Entering the 21st century, residents of Appalachia are viewed by many Americans as uneducated and unrefined, resulting in culture-based stereotyping and discrimination in many areas, including employment and housing. Such discrimination has prompted some to seek redress under prevailing federal and state civil rights laws.

==== Feuds ====
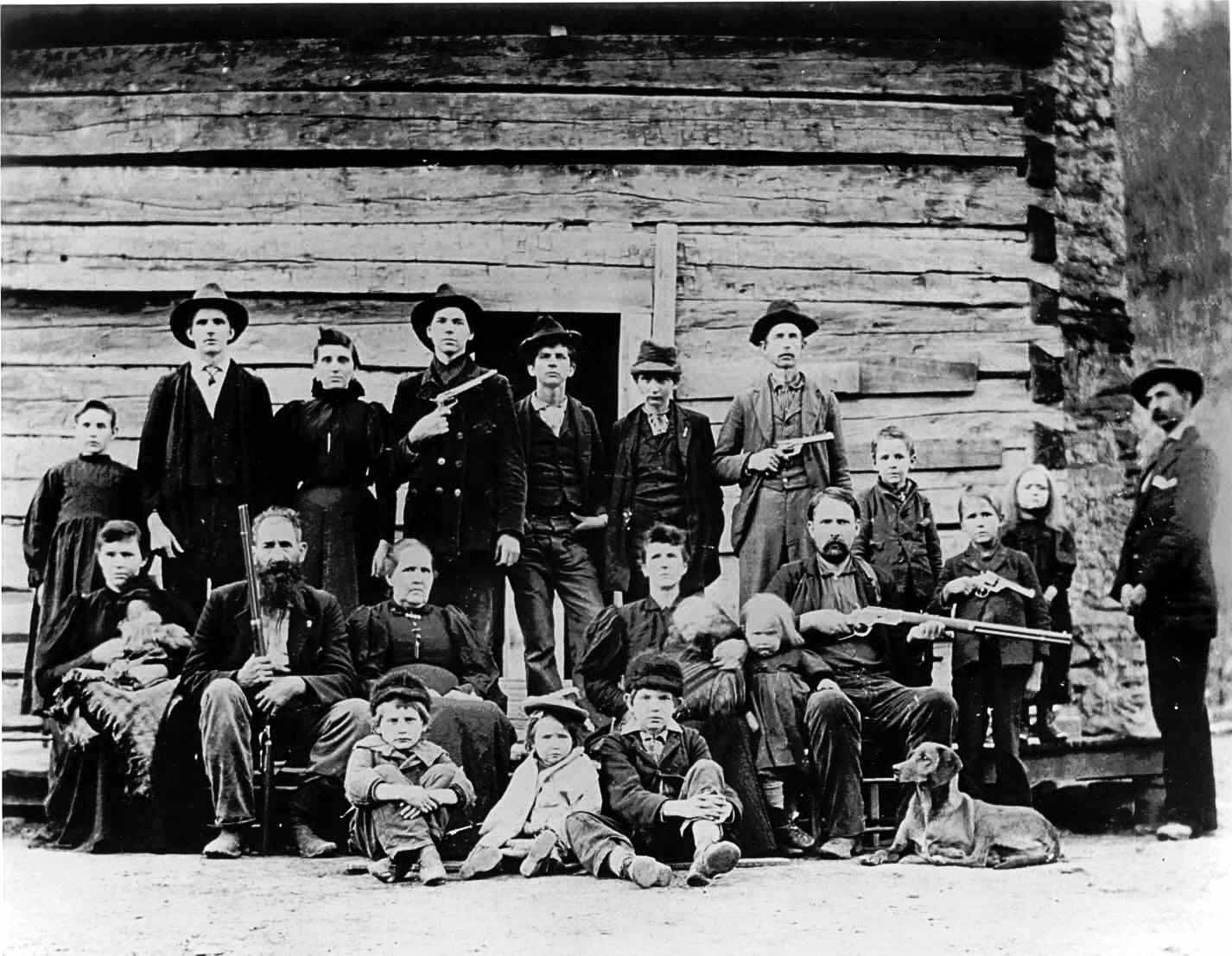
The Hatfield clan in 1897

Appalachia, and especially Kentucky, became nationally known for its violent feuds in the remote mountain districts. They pitted the men in extended clans against each other for decades, often using assassination and arson as weapons, along with ambushes, gunfights, and pre-arranged shootouts. The infamous Hatfield-McCoy Feud was the best-known of these family feuds. Some of the feuds were continuations of violent local Civil War episodes. Journalists often wrote about the violence, using stereotypes that "city folks" had developed about Appalachia; they interpreted the feuds as the natural products of profound ignorance, poverty, and isolation, and perhaps even inbreeding. In reality, the leading participants were typically well-to-do local elites with networks of clients who, like the Northeast and Chicago political machines, fought for their power over local and regional politics.

=== Modern Appalachia ===
Logging firms' rapid devastation of the forests of the Appalachians sparked a movement among conservationists to preserve what remained and allow the land to "heal". In 1911, Congress passed the Weeks Act, giving the federal government authority to create national forests east of the Mississippi River and control timber harvesting. Regional writers and business interests led a movement to create national parks in the eastern United States similar to Yosemite and Yellowstone in the west, culminating in the creation of the Great Smoky Mountains National Park, Shenandoah National Park, Cumberland Gap National Historical Park, and the Blue Ridge Parkway in the 1930s. During the same period, New England forester Benton MacKaye led the movement to build the 2,175-mile (3,500 km) Appalachian Trail, stretching from Georgia to Maine.

Several significant moments of investment by the United States government into areas of science and technology were established in the mid-20th century, notably with NASA's Marshall Space Flight Center in Huntsville, Alabama, crucial with the design of Apollo program launch vehicles and propulsion of the Space Shuttle program, and at adjacent facilities Oak Ridge National Laboratory and the Y-12 National Security Complex in Oak Ridge, Tennessee with the Manhattan Project and advancements in supercomputing and nuclear power.

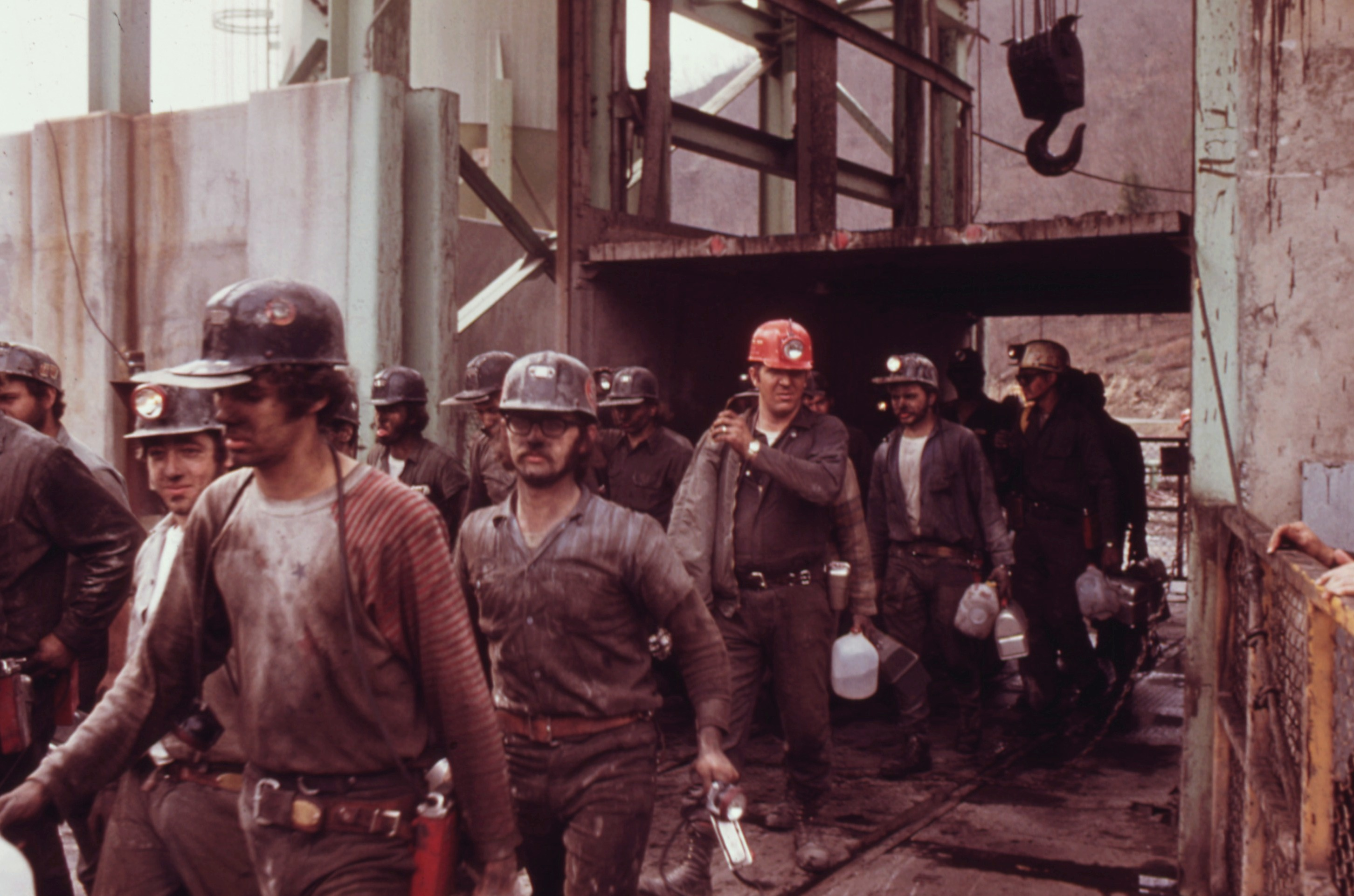
Coal miners exiting a winder cage at a mine near Richlands, Virginia in 1974

By the 1950s, poor farming techniques and the loss of jobs to mechanization in the mining industry had left much of central and southern Appalachia poverty-stricken. The lack of jobs also led to widespread difficulties with outmigration. Beginning in the 1930s, federal agencies such as the Tennessee Valley Authority began investing in the Appalachian region. Sociologists such as James Brown, folklorists and linguists such as Cratis Williams, and authors such as Harry Caudill and Michael Harrington brought attention to the region's plight in the 1960s, prompting Congress to create the Appalachian Regional Commission in 1965. The commission's efforts helped to stem the tide of outmigration and diversify the region's economies. Although there have been drastic improvements in the region's economic conditions since the commission's founding, the ARC listed 80 counties as "distressed" in 2020, with nearly half of them (38) in Kentucky.

Since the 1980s, population growth in southern Appalachia has brought about concerns of farmland loss and hazards to the local environment. Regarding housing development, exurban development, characterized by its low-density housing, has violated the habitats of native species and contributed significantly to the decline in agricultural land use in larger Appalachia.

The collapse of burley tobacco as the cash crop in the 1990s and 2000s for the farming industry in East Tennessee, Kentucky, Southwest Virginia, and Western North Carolina has contributed to the rise of illegal production of cannabis in the Southern Appalachia region. In 1998, the United States Department of Justice established the Appalachia High Intensity Drug Trafficking Area (HIDTA) across 65 counties in Tennessee, Kentucky, Virginia, and West Virginia to support law enforcement measures to combat marijuana production and distribution in the region.

There are growing IT sectors in many parts of the region. Frontier, the third fastest supercomputer in the world, is housed at Oak Ridge National Laboratory. In the 21st century, Appalachia has swung heavily towards the Republican Party.

== Cities ==
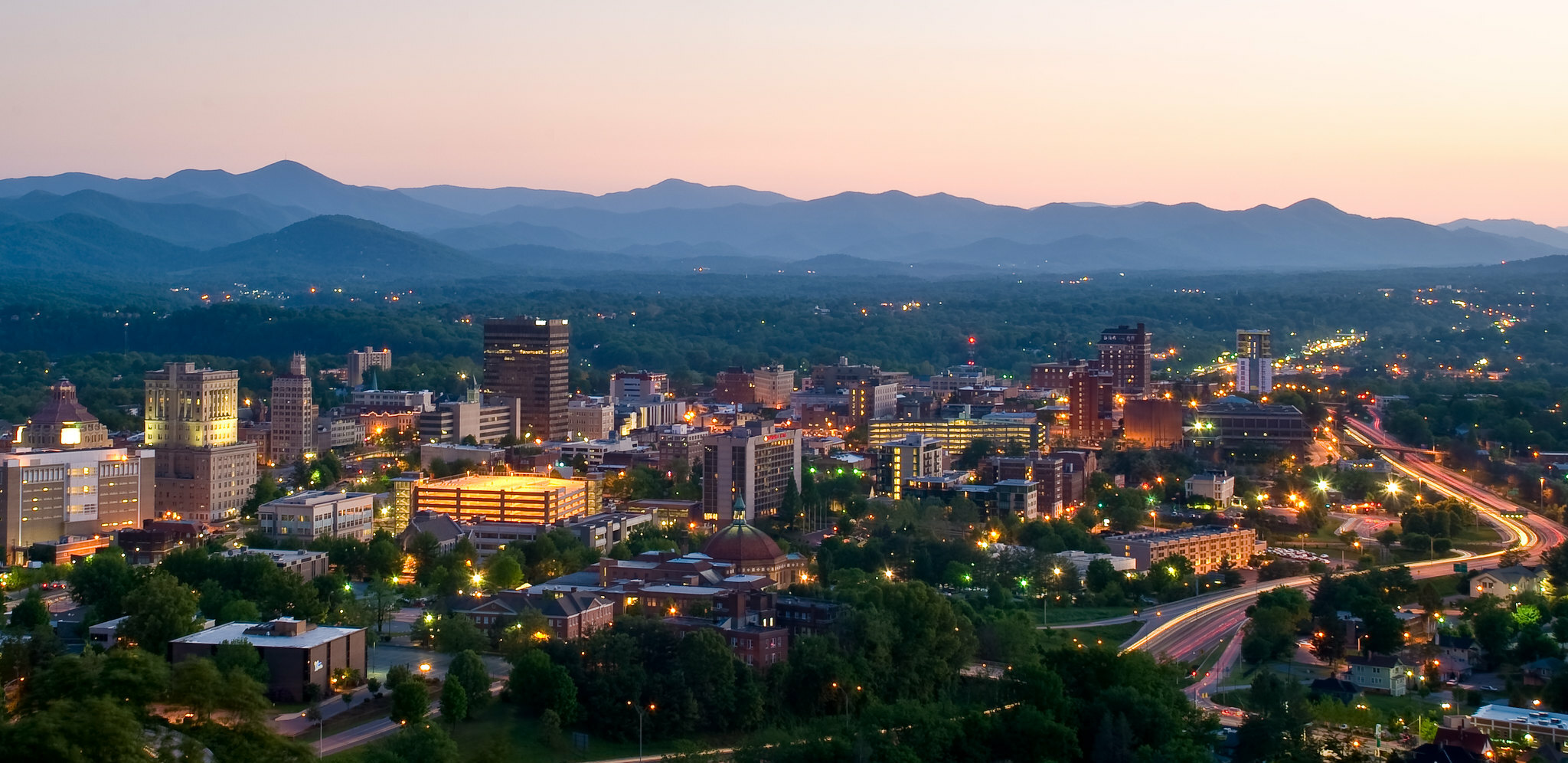
Asheville, North Carolina at dusk

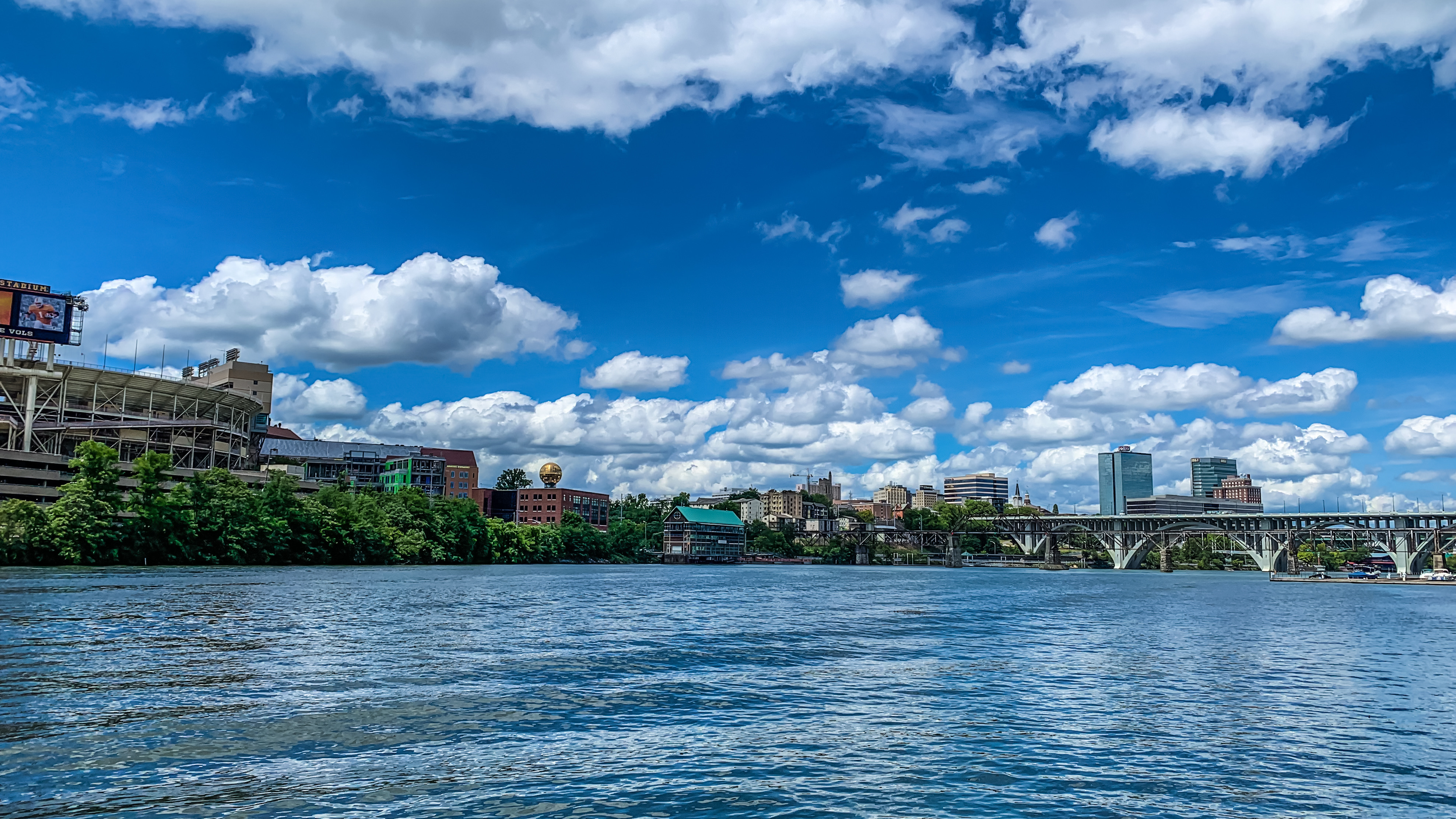
Knoxville, Tennessee skyline

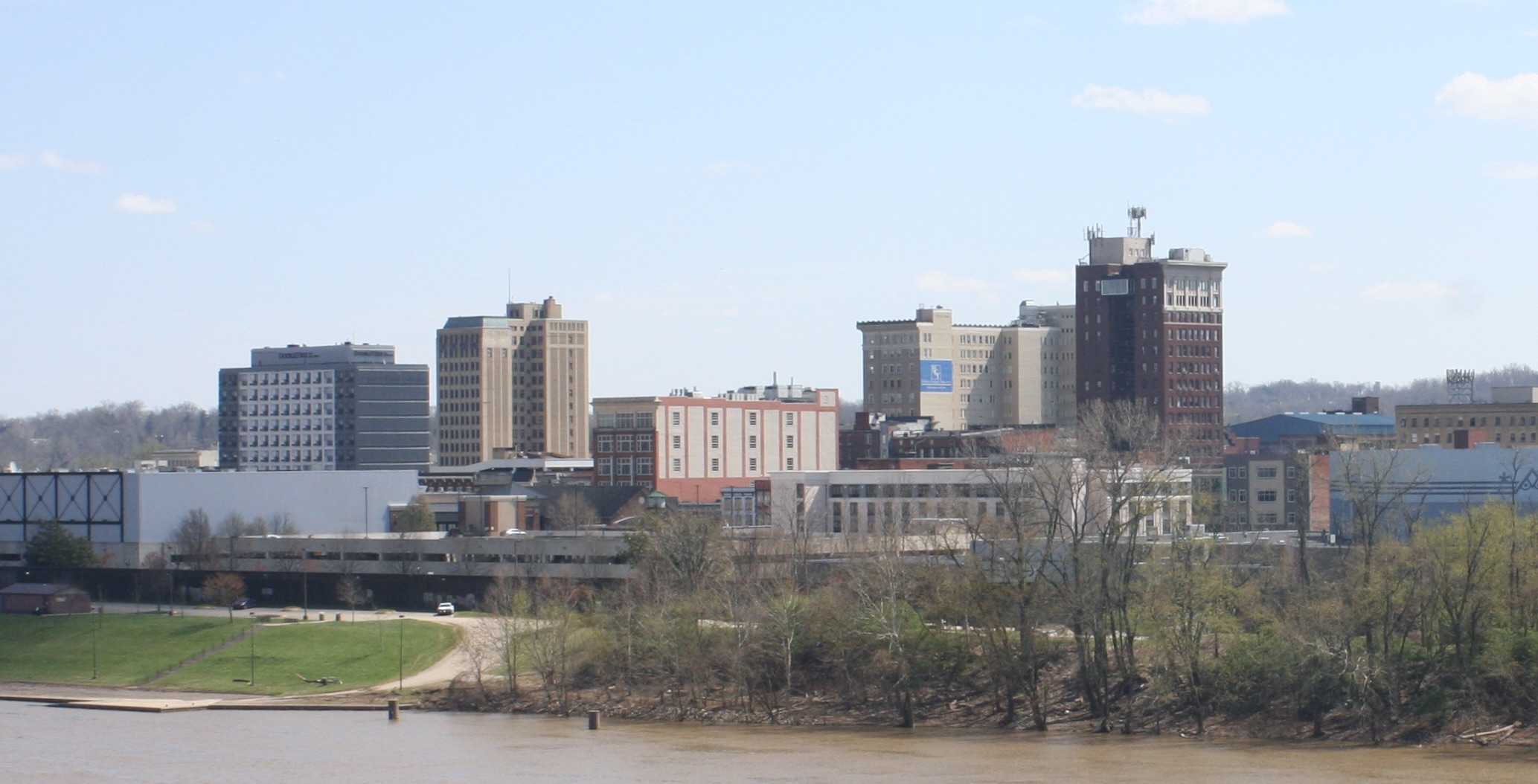
Huntington, West Virginia skyline

Due to topographic considerations, several major cities are located near but not included in Appalachia. These include Cincinnati, Ohio, Cleveland, Ohio, Nashville, Tennessee, and Atlanta, Georgia. Pittsburgh is the largest city by population to be sometimes considered within the Appalachian region.

As defined by the 2020 census, the following metropolitan statistical areas and micropolitan statistical areas (MSAs) are sometimes included as part of Appalachia:

Cities not included in all definitions of Appalachia

MSA	MSA population (2020)	Principal city	Principal city population (2020)
Altoona, PA	122,822	Altoona, Pennsylvania	43,963
Anniston–Oxford, AL	112,249	Anniston, Alabama	21,564
Asheville, NC	469,454	Asheville, North Carolina	94,589
Beckley, WV	115,079	Beckley, West Virginia	17,286
Binghamton, NY	247,138	Binghamton, New York	47,969
Birmingham–Hoover, AL	1,115,289	Birmingham, Alabama	200,733
Blacksburg–Christiansburg, VA	166,378	Blacksburg, Virginia	44,826
Bloomsburg–Berwick, PA	82,863	Bloomsburg, Pennsylvania	12,711
Bluefield, WV-VA	106,363	Bluefield, West Virginia	9,658
Charleston, WV	258,859	Charleston, West Virginia	48,864
Chattanooga, TN-GA	562,647	Chattanooga, Tennessee	181,099
Cleveland, TN	126,164	Cleveland, Tennessee	47,356
Cumberland, MD-WV	95,044	Cumberland, Maryland	19,076
Dalton, GA	142,837	Dalton, Georgia	34,417
Decatur, AL	152,740	Decatur, Alabama	57,938
East Stroudsburg, PA	168,327	East Stroudsburg, Pennsylvania	9,669
Elmira, NY	84,148	Elmira, New York	26,523
Erie, PA	270,876	Erie, Pennsylvania	94,831
Florence–Muscle Shoals, AL	148,779	Florence, Alabama	40,184
Gadsden, AL	103,436	Gadsden, Alabama	33,739
Greenville-Anderson, SC	928,195	Greenville, South Carolina	70,720
Hagerstown–Martinsburg, MD-WV	293,844	Hagerstown, Maryland	43,527
Harrisonburg, VA	135,571	Harrisonburg, Virginia	51,814
Huntington–Ashland, WV-KY-OH	359,862	Huntington, West Virginia	46,842
Huntsville, AL	491,723	Huntsville, Alabama	215,006
Ithaca, NY	105,740	Ithaca, New York	32,108
Johnson City, TN	207,285	Johnson City, Tennessee	71,046
Johnstown, PA	133,472	Johnstown, Pennsylvania	18,411
Kingsport-Bristol, TN-VA	307,614	Kingsport, Tennessee	55,442
Knoxville, TN	879,773	Knoxville, Tennessee	190,740
Morgantown, WV	140,038	Morgantown, West Virginia	30,347
Morristown, TN	142,709	Morristown, Tennessee	30,431
Oneonta, NY	58,524	Oneonta, New York	13,079
Parkersburg–Vienna, WV	89,490	Parkersburg, West Virginia	29,749
Pittsburgh, PA	2,370,930	Pittsburgh, Pennsylvania	302,971
Roanoke, VA	315,251	Roanoke, Virginia	100,011
Rome, GA	98,584	Rome, Georgia	37,713
Scranton–Wilkes-Barre, PA	567,559	Scranton, Pennsylvania	76,328
Spartanburg, SC	327,997	Spartanburg, South Carolina	38,732
State College, PA	158,172	State College, Pennsylvania	40,501
Staunton–Waynesboro, VA	125,433	Staunton, Virginia	25,750
Tuscaloosa, AL	268,674	Tuscaloosa, Alabama	100,618
Weirton–Steubenville, WV-OH	116,903	Weirton, West Virginia	19,163
Wheeling, WV-OH	139,513	Wheeling, West Virginia	27,062
Williamsport, PA	114,188	Williamsport, Pennsylvania	27,754
Winchester, VA-WV	142,632	Winchester, Virginia	28,120
Winston-Salem, NC	675,966	Winston-Salem, North Carolina	249,545
Youngstown–Warren–Boardman, OH–PA	541,243	Youngstown, Ohio	60,068

== Culture ==
=== Ethnic groups ===
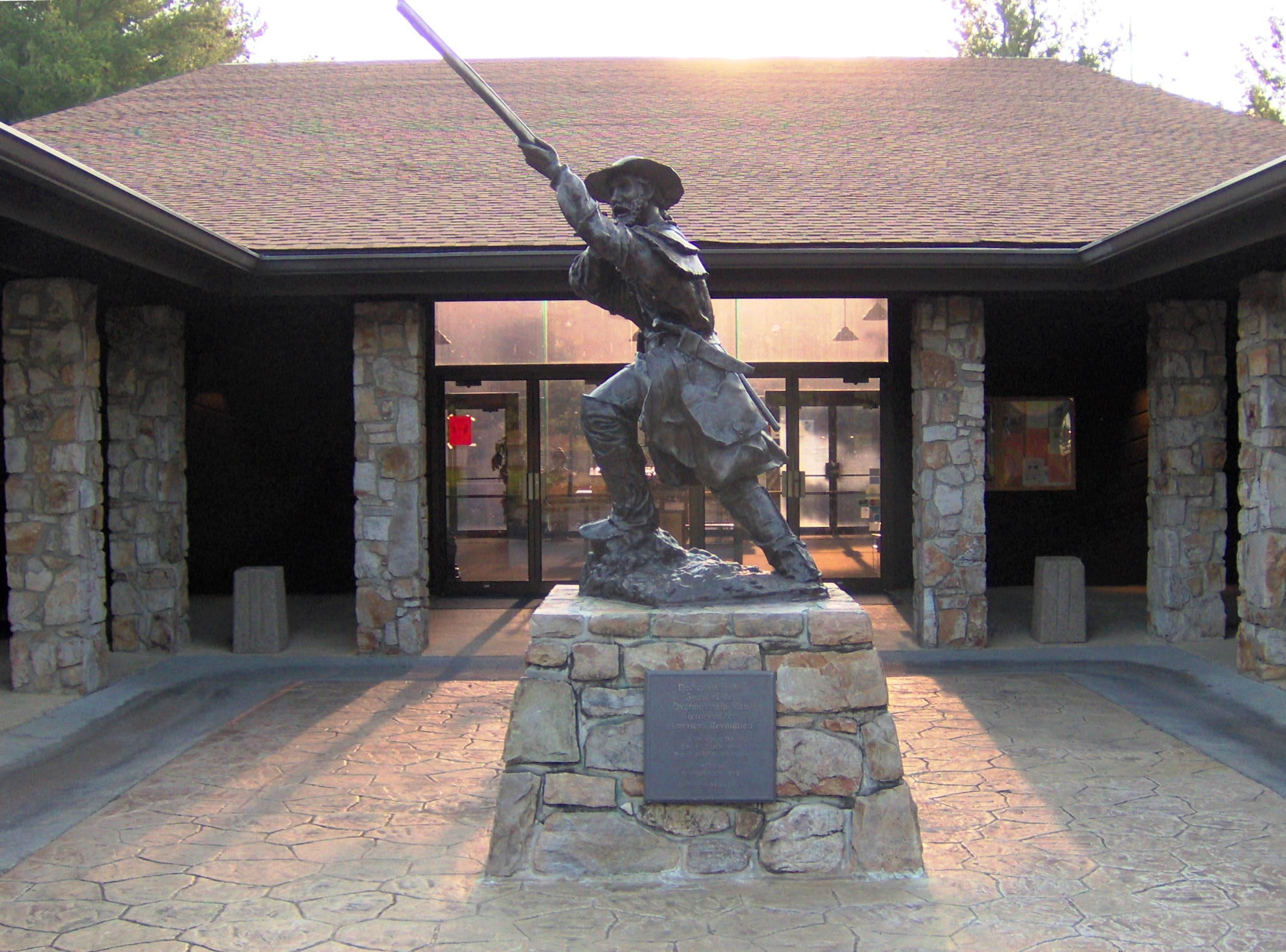
Jon-Mark Estep's The Overmountain Man, a personification of the Appalachian people, at Sycamore Shoals State Historic Park, in Elizabethton, Tennessee

An estimated 90% of Appalachia's earliest European settlers originated from the Anglo-Scottish border country—namely the English counties of Cumberland, Westmorland, Northumberland, County Durham, Lancashire and Yorkshire, and the Lowland Scottish counties of Ayrshire, Dumfriesshire, Roxburghshire, Berwickshire and Wigtownshire. Most of these were from families who had been resettled in the Ulster Plantation in Northern Ireland in the 17th century, but some came directly from the Anglo-Scottish border region. In America, these people are often grouped under the single name "Scotch-Irish" or "Scots-Irish". Many of these Scots-Irish emigrated to the Blue Mountains in North Carolina and Tennessee.

Although Swedes and Finns formed only a tiny portion of the Appalachian settlers, it was Swedish and Finnish settlers of New Sweden who brought the northern European woodsman skills such as log cabin construction which formed the basis of backwoods Appalachian material culture.

Germans, like the Shenandoah Deitsch, were a major pioneer group to migrate to Appalachia, settling mainly in western Pennsylvania and southwest Virginia. Smaller numbers of Germans were also among the initial wave of migrants to the southern mountains. The initial wave of Appalachian ethnography and anthropology in the first half of the 20th century disregarded this German culture, instead choosing to focus almost solely on the Scots-Irish component of Appalachian culture. This was likely due to Germanophobia caused by the two World Wars, and has since begun to be corrected.

In the 19th century, Welsh immigrants were brought into the region for their mining and metallurgical expertise, and by 1900 over 100,000 Welsh immigrants were living in western Pennsylvania alone. Thousands of German-speaking Swiss migrated to Appalachia in the second half of the 19th century, and their descendants remain in places such as East Bernstadt, Kentucky, and Gruetli-Laager, Tennessee. The coal mining, steel, and manufacturing boom in the late 19th and early 20th centuries brought large numbers of Italians and Eastern Europeans to Appalachia and a significant number of Spaniards from Asturias to West Virginia and Pennsylvania to work in the zinc industry. Many of these families left the region when the Great Depression shattered the economy in the 1930s and mines closed in the 1950s. African Americans have been present in the region since the 18th century, and currently make up 8% of the ARC-designated region, mostly concentrated in urban areas and former mining and manufacturing towns; The African-American component of Appalachia is sometimes termed Affrilachia.

Native Americans, the region's original inhabitants, are now only a small percentage of the region's present population, their most notable concentration being the reservation of the Eastern Band of Cherokee Indians in North Carolina. The Melungeons, a group of mainly mixed African and European ancestry, are scattered across northeastern Tennessee, eastern Kentucky, and southwestern Virginia.

According to the American Factfinder's 2013 data, the Southern Appalachia has a white majority, comprising 84% of the population. African Americans are 7% and Hispanics or Latinos are 6% of the population. Asians and Pacific Islanders are 1.5% of the population. The counties have great differences among themselves, in terms of racial and ethnic diversity.

=== Religion ===
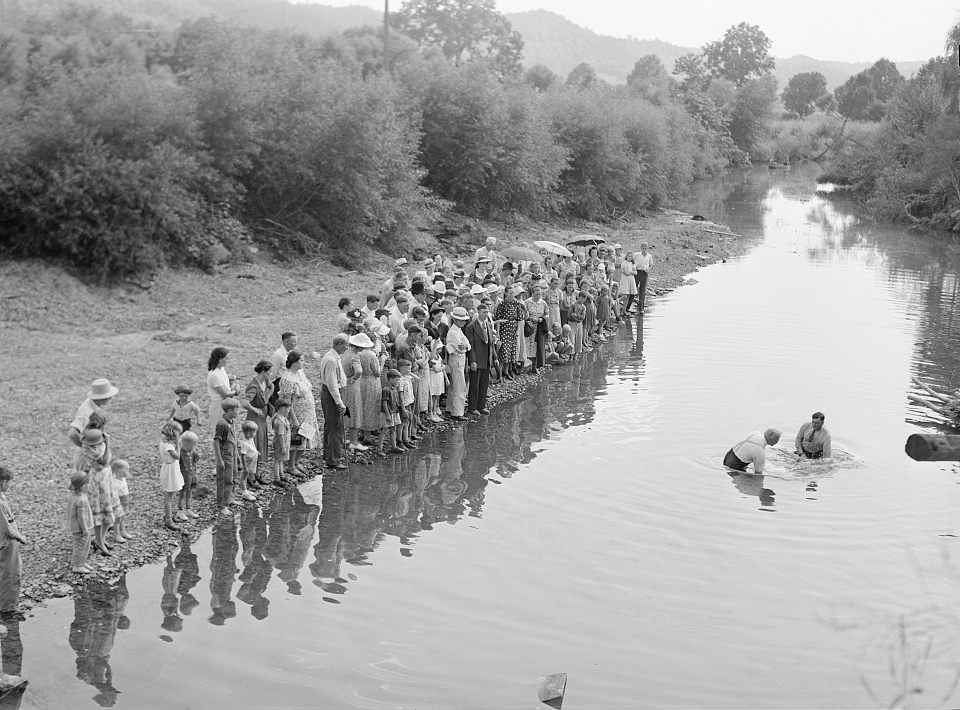
Baptism in Morehead, Kentucky, photographed by Marion Post Wolcott in 1940

Christianity is the main religion in Appalachia, which is characterized by a sense of independence and a distrust of religious hierarchies, both rooted in the evangelical tendencies of the region's pioneers, many of whom had been influenced by the Holiness movement and "New Light" movement in England. Many of the denominations brought from Europe underwent modifications or factioning during the Second Great Awakening (especially the Holiness movement) in the early 19th century. Several 18th and 19th-century religious traditions are still practiced in parts of Appalachia, including natural water (or "creek") baptism, rhythmically chanted preaching, congregational shouting, snake handling, and foot washing. While most church-goers in Appalachia attend fairly well-organized churches affiliated with regional or national bodies, small unaffiliated congregations are not uncommon in rural mountain areas.

Protestantism is the most dominant denomination in Appalachia, although there is a significant Roman Catholic presence in the northern half of the region and urban areas, such as Pittsburgh and Scranton. The region's early Lowland and Ulster Scot immigrants brought Presbyterianism to Appalachia, eventually organizing into bodies such as the Cumberland Presbyterian Church. English Baptists—most of whom had been influenced by the Separate Baptist and Regular Baptist movements—were also common on the Appalachian frontier, and today are represented in the region by groups such as the Free Will Baptists, the Southern Baptists, Missionary Baptists, and "old-time" groups such as the United Baptists and Primitive Baptists. Circuit riders such as Francis Asbury helped spread Methodism to Appalachia in the early 19th century, and today 9.2% of the region's population is Methodist, represented by such bodies as the United Methodist Church, the Free Methodist Church, and the African Methodist Episcopal Zion Church. Pentecostal movements within the region include the Church of God (based in Cleveland, Tennessee) and the Assemblies of God. Scattered Mennonite colonies exist throughout the region.

=== Dialect ===
One of the Appalachian dialects is a variety of Midland American English known as the Southern Midland dialect; it is spoken in Appalachian Ohio and across the Midwest. Pittsburghese, spoken in west Pennsylvania, emerged as a distinct variety of Midland English in the 20th century. Southern Mountain English (more commonly known simply as "Appalachian English") is considered a variety of Southern American English, although the two are distinguished by the rhotic nature of the Appalachian dialect. Early 20th-century writers believed the Appalachian dialect to be a surviving relic of Old World Scottish or Elizabethan dialects. Recent research suggests, however, that while the dialect has a stronger Scottish influence than other American dialects, most of its distinguishing characteristics have developed in the United States. African-American Appalachian English (AAAE) is a dialect spoken by Black Appalachians, which exhibits a mixture of traits from both Southern Mountain English and African-American Vernacular.

=== Education ===
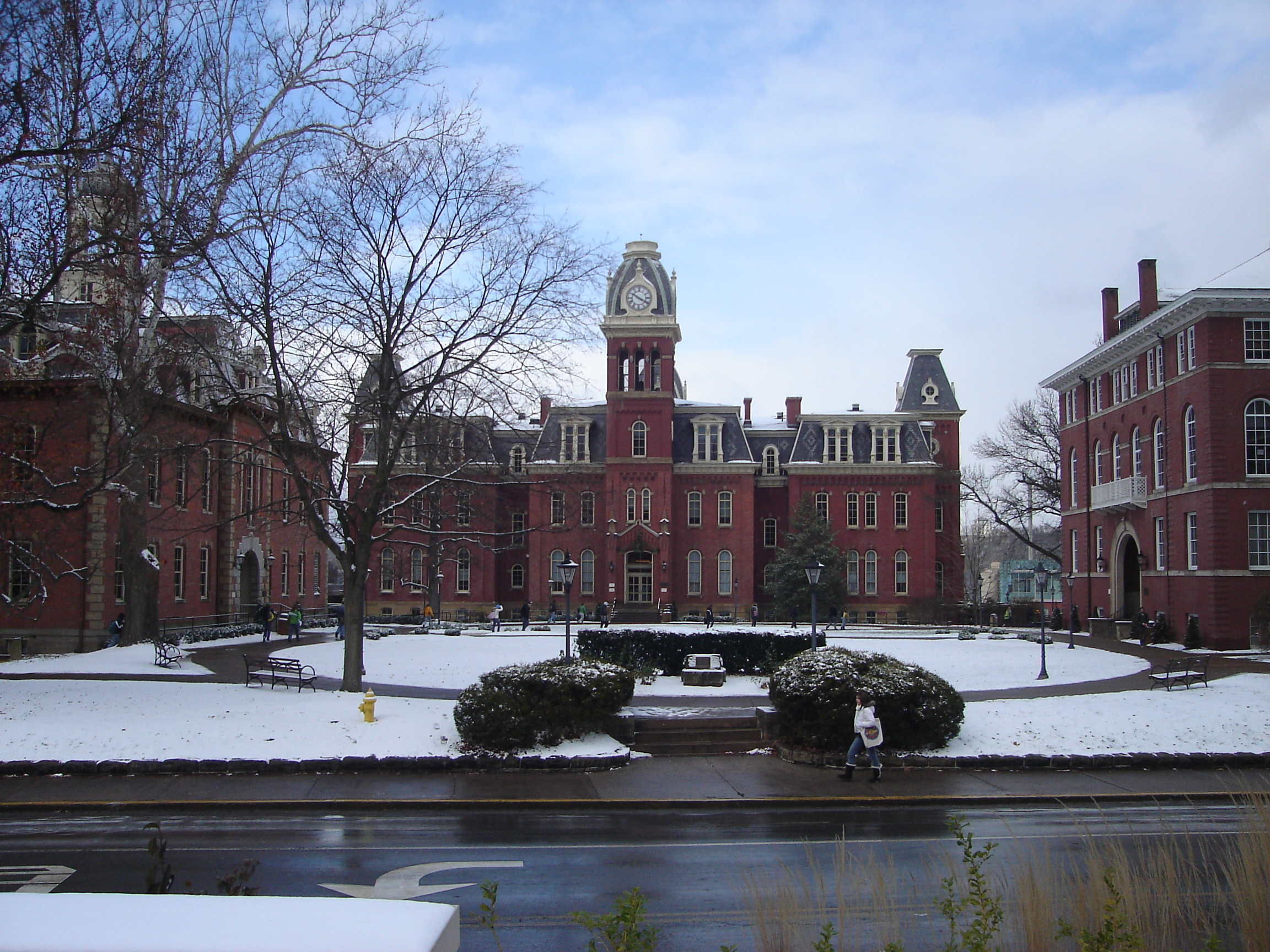
Woodburn Circle at West Virginia University in Morgantown, West Virginia

For much of the region's history, education in Appalachia has lagged behind the rest of the nation due in part to struggles with funding from respective state governments and an agrarian-oriented population that often did not see a practical need for formal education. Early education in the region evolved from teaching Christian morality and learning to read the Bible in small, one-room schoolhouses that convened in months when children were not needed to help with farm work. After the Civil War, mandatory education laws and state assistance helped larger communities begin to establish grade schools and high schools. During the same period, many of the region's institutions of higher education were established or greatly expanded. In the late 19th and early 20th centuries, service organizations such as Pi Beta Phi and various religious organizations established settlement schools and mission schools in the region's more rural areas.

In the 20th century, national trends began to have more of an effect on education in Appalachia, sometimes clashing with the region's traditional values. The Scopes Trial—the nation's most publicized debate over the teaching of the theory of evolution—took place in Dayton, Tennessee, in southern Appalachia in 1925. Despite consolidation and centralization, schools in Appalachia struggled to keep up with federal and state demands into the 21st century. Since 2001, a number of the region's public schools were threatened with loss of funding due to difficulties fulfilling the demands of No Child Left Behind.

=== Music ===
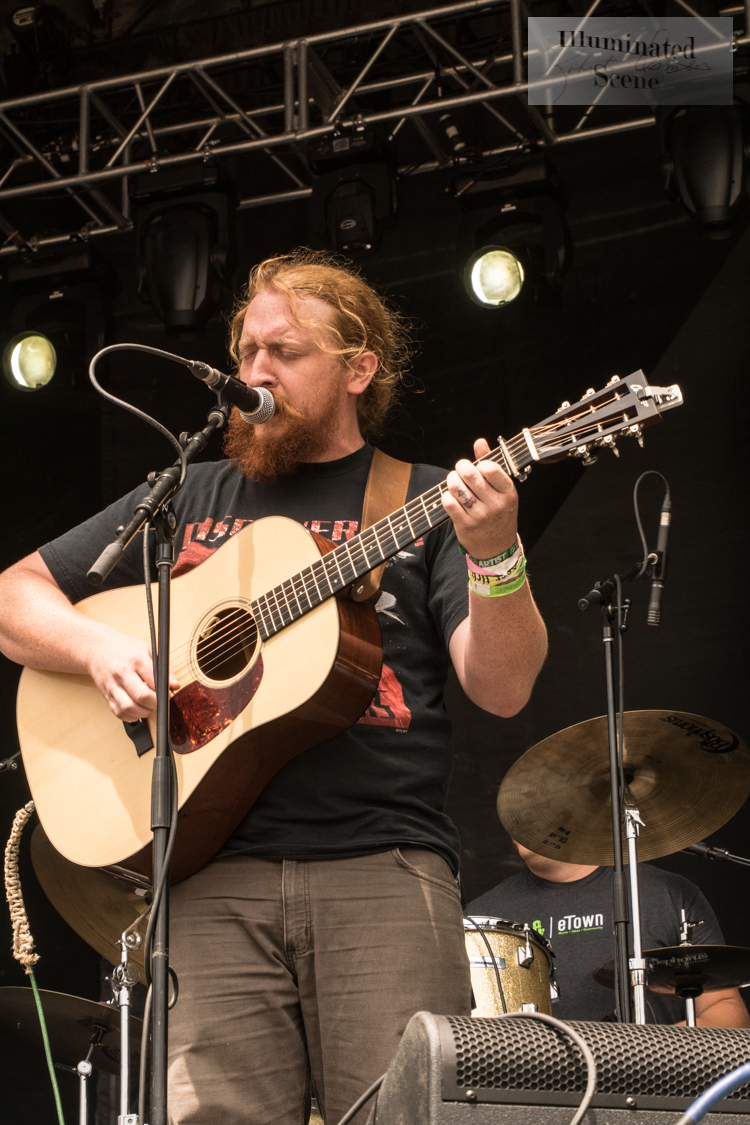
Tyler Childers, labeled by Rolling Stone as the "21st-century voice of Appalachia", addresses systemic issues facing Appalachian people in his music.

Appalachian music is one of the best-known manifestations of Appalachian culture. Traditional Appalachian music (called old-time music) is derived primarily from the English, Irish, and Scottish ballad and fiddle traditions. Another instrument known in Appalachian culture was the Appalachian dulcimer which, practically, is a guitar-shaped instrument laid on its side with a flat bottom and the strings plucked in a manner to make alternating notes.

In the years following World War I, British folklorist Cecil Sharp brought attention to Southern Appalachia when he noted that its inhabitants still sang hundreds of English and Scottish ballads that had been passed down to them from their ancestors. Commercial recordings of Appalachian musicians in the 1920s (such as the famous 1927 Bristol sessions) would have a significant impact on the development of country music and bluegrass. Traditional Appalachian music saw a resurgence in popularity across the country during the American folk music revival of the 1960s, when musicologists such as Mike Seeger, John Cohen, and Ralph Rinzler traveled to remote parts of the region in search of musicians who they thought were unaffected by modern music. Today, dozens of annual music festivals held throughout the region preserve the Appalachian music tradition.

=== Literature ===
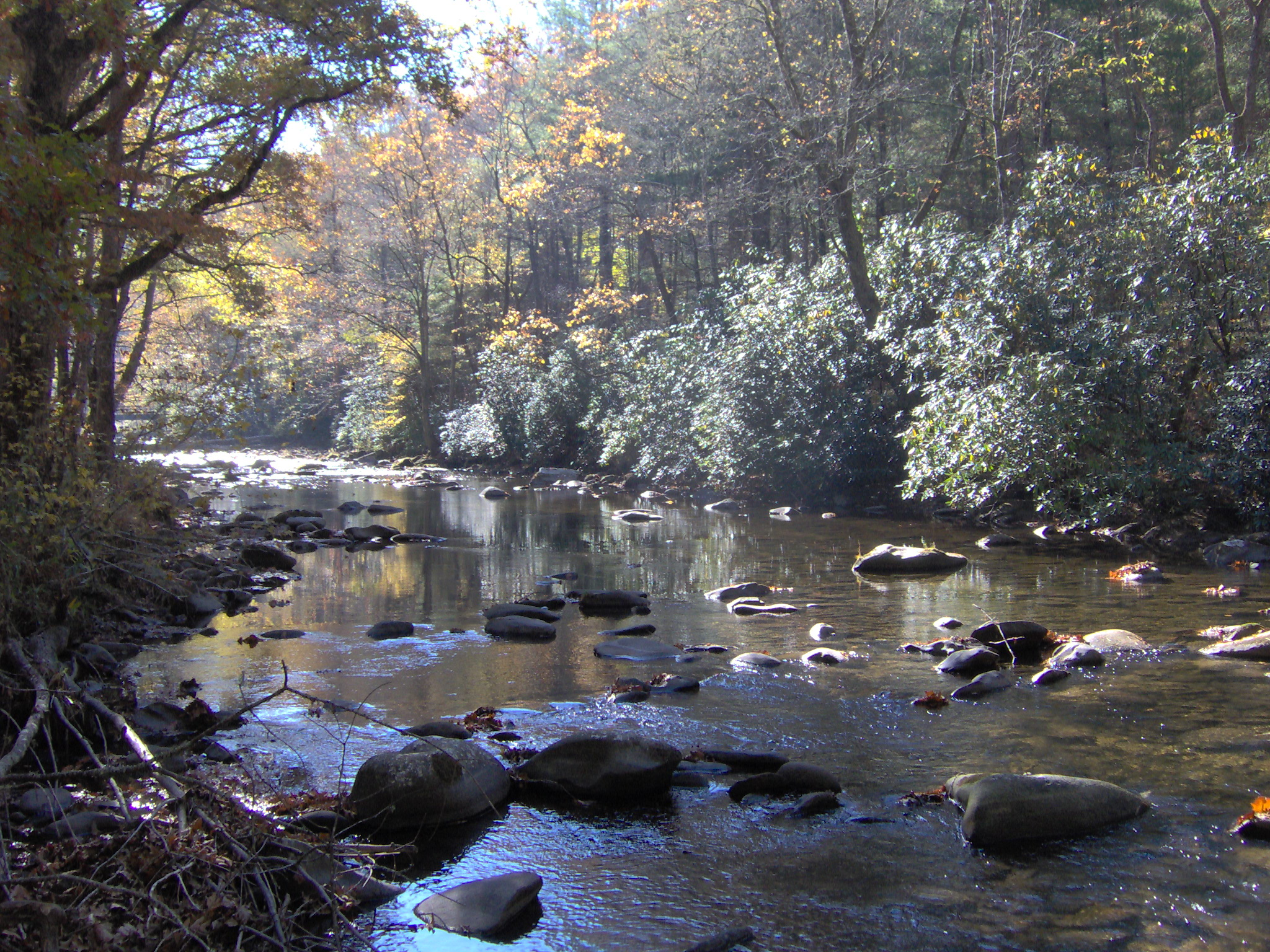
Hazel Creek flowing through what was once the site of Proctor, North Carolina, setting of Kephart's book Our Southern Highlanders (1913–1922)

Early Appalachian literature typically centered on the observations of people from outside the region, such as Henry Timberlake's Memoirs (1765) and Thomas Jefferson's Notes on the State of Virginia (1784), although there are notable exceptions, including Davy Crockett's A Narrative of the Life of Davy Crockett (1834). Travellers' accounts published in 19th-century magazines gave rise to Appalachian local color, which reached its height with George Washington Harris's Sut Lovingood character of the 1860s and native novelists such as Mary Noailles Murfree. Works such as Rebecca Harding Davis's Life in the Iron Mills (1861), Emma Bell Miles' The Spirit of the Mountains (1905), Catherine Marshall's Christy (1912), Horace Kephart's Our Southern Highlanders (1913) marked a shift in the region's literature from local color to realism. The transition from an agrarian society to an industrial society and its effects on Appalachia is captured in works such as Olive Tilford Dargan's Call Home to the Heart (1932), Agnes Sligh Turnbull's The Rolling Years (1936), James Still's The River of Earth (1940), Harriette Simpson Arnow's The Dollmaker (1954), and Harry Caudill's Night Comes to the Cumberlands (1962). In the 1970s and 1980s, the rise of authors like Breece D'J Pancake, Dorothy Allison, and Lisa Alther brought greater literary diversity to the region.

Along with the above-mentioned, some of Appalachia's best known writers include James Agee (A Death in the Family), Anne W. Armstrong (This Day and Time), Wendell Berry (Hannah Coulter, The Unforeseen Wilderness: An Essay on Kentucky's Red River Gorge, Selected Poems of Wendell Berry), Jesse Stuart (Taps for Private Tussie, The Thread That Runs So True), Denise Giardina (The Unquiet Earth, Storming Heaven), Lee Smith (Fair and Tender Ladies, On Agate Hill), Silas House (Clay's Quilt, A Parchment of Leaves), Wilma Dykeman (The Far Family, The Tall Woman), Keith Maillard (Alex Driving South, Light in the Company of Women, Hazard Zones, Gloria, Running, Morgantown, Lyndon Johnson and the Majorettes, Looking Good) Maurice Manning (Bucolics, A Companion for Owls), Anne Shelby (Appalachian Studies, We Keep a Store), George Ella Lyon (Borrowed Children, Don't You Remember?), Pamela Duncan (Moon Women, The Big Beautiful), David Joy (Where All Light Tends to Go, The Weight of This World), Chris Offutt (No Heroes, The Good Brother), Charles Frazier (Cold Mountain, Thirteen Moons), Sharyn McCrumb (The Hangman's Beautiful Daughter), Robert Morgan (Gap Creek), Jim Wayne Miller (The Brier Poems), Gurney Norman (Divine Right's Trip, Kinfolks), Ron Rash (Serena), Elizabeth Madox Roberts (The Great Meadow, The Time of Man), Thomas Wolfe (Look Homeward Angel, You Can't Go Home Again), Rachel Carson (The Sea Around Us, Silent Spring; Presidential Medal of Freedom), and Jeannette Walls (The Glass Castle).

Appalachian literature crosses with the larger genre of Southern literature. Internationally renowned writers such as William Faulkner and Cormac McCarthy have made notable contributions to the American canon with tales set within Appalachia. McCarthy's Suttree (1979) is an intense vision of the squalidness and brutality of life along the Tennessee River, in the heart of Appalachia. Other McCarthy novels set in Appalachia include The Orchard Keeper (1965), Outer Dark (1968), and Child of God (1973). Appalachia also serves as the origin point for the kid, the protagonist of McCarthy's Western masterpiece Blood Meridian. Faulkner's hometown of Oxford, Mississippi, is on the borderlands of what is considered Appalachia, but his fictional Yoknapatawpha should be considered part of the region. Almost all of the fiction which earned him the Nobel Prize is set there, including Light in August and Absalom, Absalom.

=== Folklore and legends ===
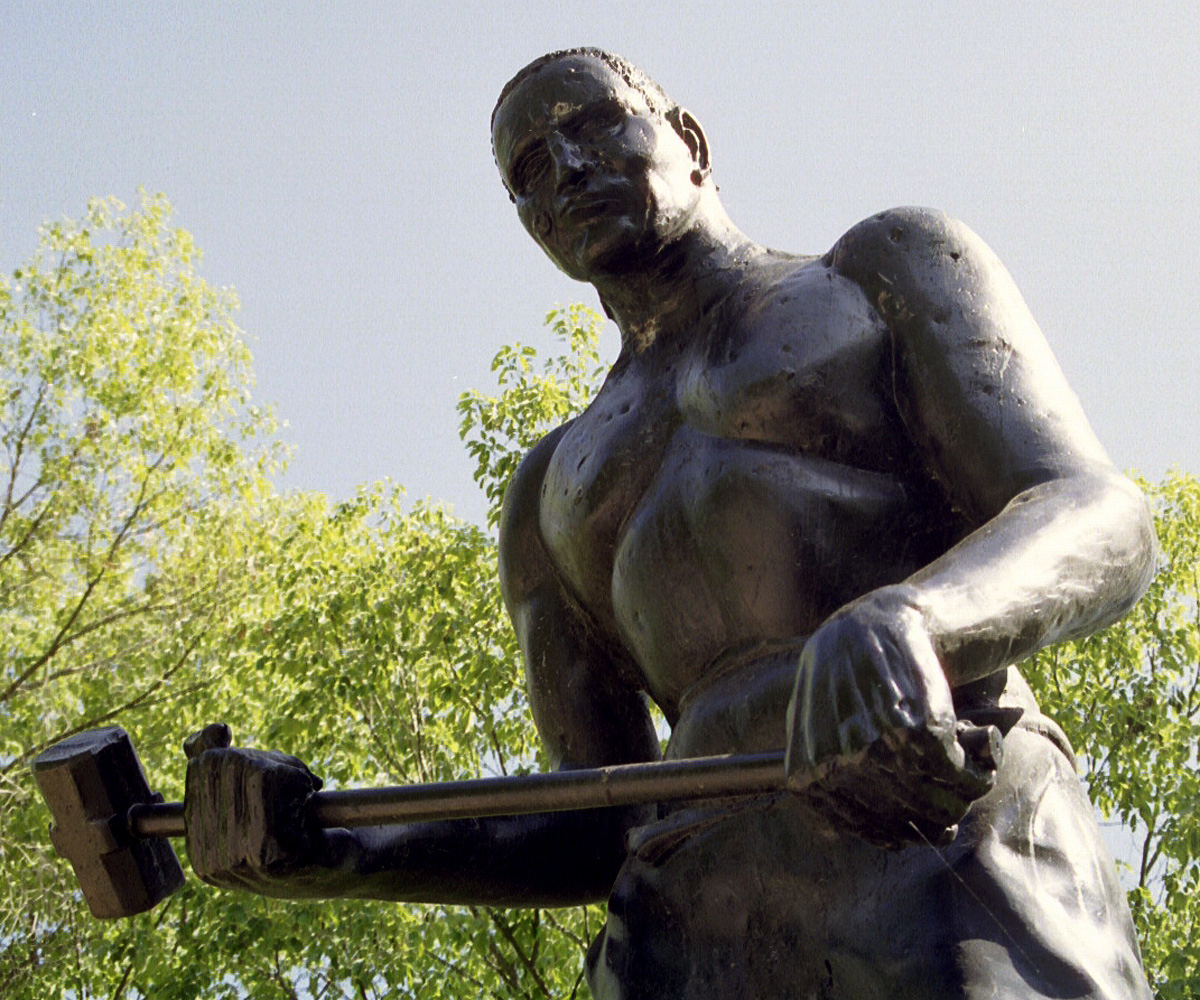
A statue of legendary railroad worker John Henry in Talcott, West Virginia

Appalachian folklore has a strong mixture of European, Native American (especially Cherokee), and Biblical influences. The Cherokee taught the region's early European pioneers how to plant and cultivate crops such as corn and squash and how to find edible plants such as ramps. The Cherokee also passed along their knowledge of the medicinal properties of hundreds of native herbs and roots, and how to prepare tonics from such plants. S. Pearson writes that white Appalachians see themselves as inheriting Indigeneity via lore, such as stories of being taught 'how to survive' by Cherokee. He says that they recreated themselves as Indigenous due to their failure to acquire land. Jason Hockaday echoes these statements.

Before the introduction of modern agricultural techniques in the region in the 1930s and 1940s, many Appalachian farmers followed the Biblical tradition of planting by "the signs", such as the phases of the moon, or when certain weather conditions occurred.

==== Storytelling traditions ====
Cherokee folklore continues to influence storytelling in the Appalachians, including depictions and characteristics of regional animals. As told by Eastern Band Cherokee and western North Carolina storyteller Jerry Wolfe, these creatures include the chipmunk, also known as "seven stripes" from an angry bear scratching him down the back—four claw marks and the spaces in between making seven—and the copperhead who sneaks and thieves his way into becoming venomous.

Appalachian folk tales are rooted in English, Scottish, and Irish fairy tales, as well as regional heroic figures and events. Jack tales, which tend to revolve around the exploits of a simple but dedicated figure named "Jack", are popular at story-telling festivals. Other stories involve wild animals, such as hunting tales. In the industrial areas of western Pennsylvania and northern West Virginia, the composite Joe Magarac steelworker story has been handed down. Regional folk heroes such as the railroad worker John Henry and frontiersmen Davy Crockett, Mike Fink and Johnny Appleseed are examples of real-life figures that evolved into popular folk tale subjects. Murder stories, such as Omie Wise and John Hardy, are popular subjects for Appalachian ballads. Ghost stories, or "haint tales" in regional English, are a common feature of southern oral and literary tradition. Ghost stories native to the region include the story of the Greenbrier Ghost, which is rooted in a Greenbrier County, West Virginia, murder.

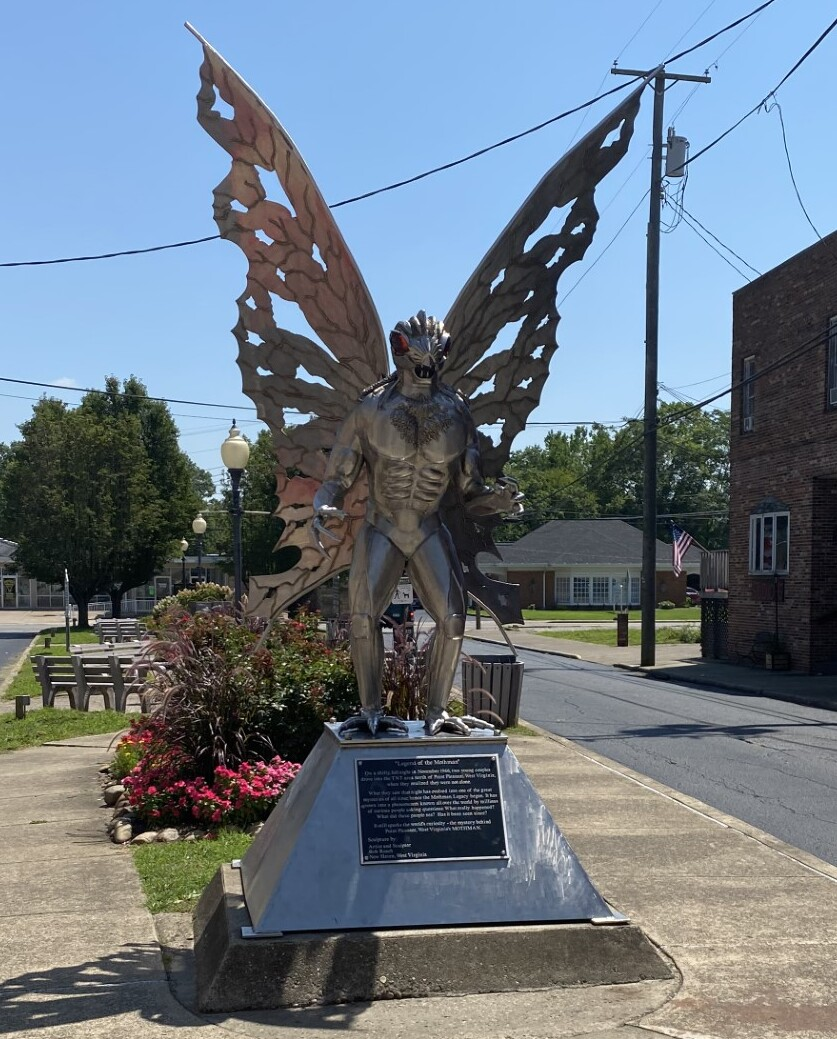
A statue of the mythical Mothman in Point Pleasant, West Virginia

==== Urban legends ====
Several urban legends and horror stories have been rooted in the Appalachia region. Since the 1960s the Point Pleasant, West Virginia, legend of Mothman has originated and been explored in popular culture including the 2002 film The Mothman Prophecies loosely retelling the original tale. Since the 1910s, reports of glowing orbs around the Brown Mountain ridgeline in North Carolina have been the subject of paranormal theories including the ghosts of slaves or Cherokee tribal warriors. Known as the Brown Mountain lights, the story has been adapted in popular culture, including an episode of the 1990s sci-fi drama The X-Files. The infamous story of the Bell Witch haunting in Tennessee has influenced several major films of the horror genre, including Poltergeist, The Blair Witch Project, and the Paranormal Activity series.

=== Urban Appalachians ===
Urban Appalachians are people from Appalachia who are living in metropolitan areas outside the Appalachian region. In the decades following the Great Depression and World War II, many Appalachian residents moved to industrial cities in the north and west in a migration that became known as the "Hillbilly Highway". The mechanization of coal mining during the 1950s and 1960s was the major source of unemployment in central Appalachia. Many migration streams covered relatively short distances, with West Virginians moving to Cleveland and other cities in eastern and central Ohio, and eastern Kentuckians moving to Cincinnati and southwest Ohio in search of jobs. More distant cities like Detroit and Chicago attracted migrants from many states. Enclaves of Appalachian culture can still be found in some of these communities.

=== Communications ===
In the 1940s through the 1960s, Wheeling, West Virginia, became a cultural center of the region because it had a clear-channel AM radio station, WWVA, which could be heard throughout the entirety of the eastern United States at night. Although Pittsburgh's KDKA was a 50-kilowatt clear channel station that dated back to the early 1920s (as well as spanning all the East Coast in signal strength), WWVA prided itself on rural and farm programming that appealed to a wider audience in the rural region. Cincinnati's WLW also was relied on by many in the central and northern areas of Appalachia.

In the southern part of the region, WSB-AM Atlanta and WSM-AM Nashville, flagship of the Grand Ole Opry, were major stations for the region's population during the 20th century, and remain strong in the sub-region.

=== Appalachian studies ===
Appalachia as an academic interest was the product of a critical scholarship that emerged across the disciplines in the 1960s and 1970s. With a renewed interest in issues of power, scholars could not dismiss the social inequity, class conflict, and environmental destruction encountered by America's so-called "hillbillies". Appalachia's emergence in academia is a result of the intersection between social conditions and critical academic interests, and has resulted in the development of many Appalachian studies programs in colleges and universities across the region, as well as in the Appalachian Studies Association.

== Economy ==
The economy of Appalachia traditionally rested on agriculture, mining, timber, and in the cities, manufacturing. Since the late 20th century, tourism and second-home developments have assumed an increasingly major role. Appalachia has many different economic sectors, from aerospace and defense industries in the Greater Huntsville area in the southern part of Appalachia to tourism in many areas such as the Great Smoky Mountains and the Blue Ridge Parkway.

=== Agriculture ===
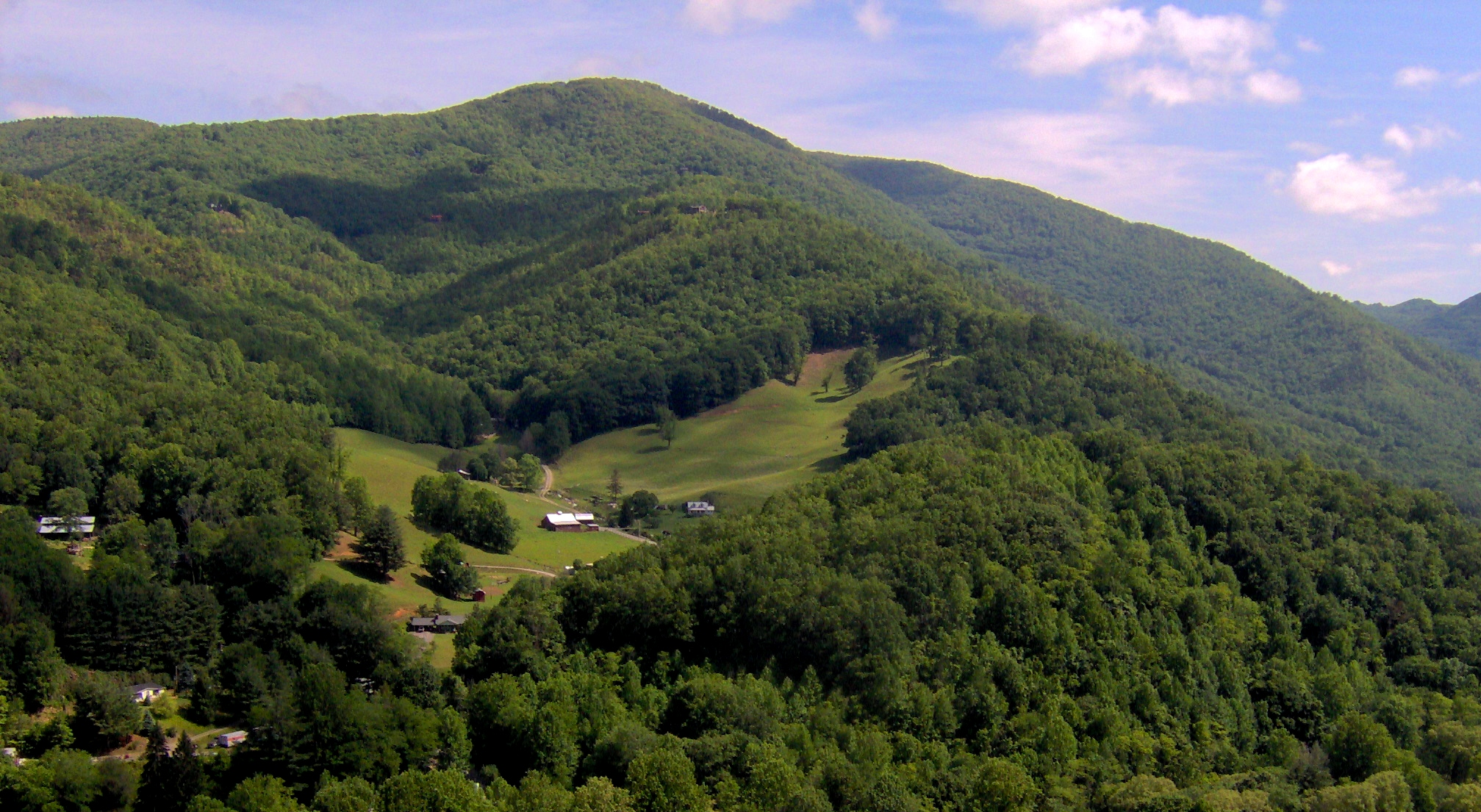
A highland pasture near Maggie Valley, North Carolina

While the climate of the Appalachian region is suitable for agriculture, the region's hilly terrain greatly limits the size of the average farm, a problem exacerbated by population growth in the latter half of the 19th century. Subsistence farming was the backbone of the Appalachian economy throughout much of the 19th century, and while economies in places such as western Pennsylvania, the Great Valley of Virginia, and the upper Tennessee Valley in east Tennessee, transitioned to a large-scale farming or manufacturing base around the time of the Civil War, subsistence farming remained an important part of the region's economy until the 1950s. In the early 20th century, Appalachian farmers were struggling to mechanize, and abusive farming practices had over the years left much of the already-limited farmland badly eroded. Various federal entities intervened in the 1930s to restore damaged areas and introduce less harmful farming techniques. In recent decades, the concept of sustainable agriculture has been applied to the region's small farms, with some success. Nevertheless, the number of farms in the Appalachian region continues to dwindle, plunging from 354,748 farms on 47 million acres (190,000 km^{2}) in 1969 to 230,050 farms on 35 million acres (140,000 km^{2}) in 1997.

Early Appalachian farmers grew both crops introduced from their native Europe as well as crops native to North America (such as corn and squash). Tobacco has long been an important cash crop in Southern Appalachia, especially since the land is ill-suited for cash crops such as cotton. Apples have been grown in the region since the late 18th century, their cultivation being aided by the presence of thermal belts in the region's mountain valleys. Hogs, which could free range in the region's abundant forests, often on chestnuts, were the most popular livestock among early Appalachian farmers. The American chestnut was also an important human food source until the chestnut blight struck in the 20th century. The early settlers also brought cattle and sheep to the region, which they would typically graze in highland meadows known as balds during the growing season when bottomlands were needed for crops. Cattle, mainly the Hereford, Angus, and Charolais breeds, are now the region's chief livestock.

=== Logging ===
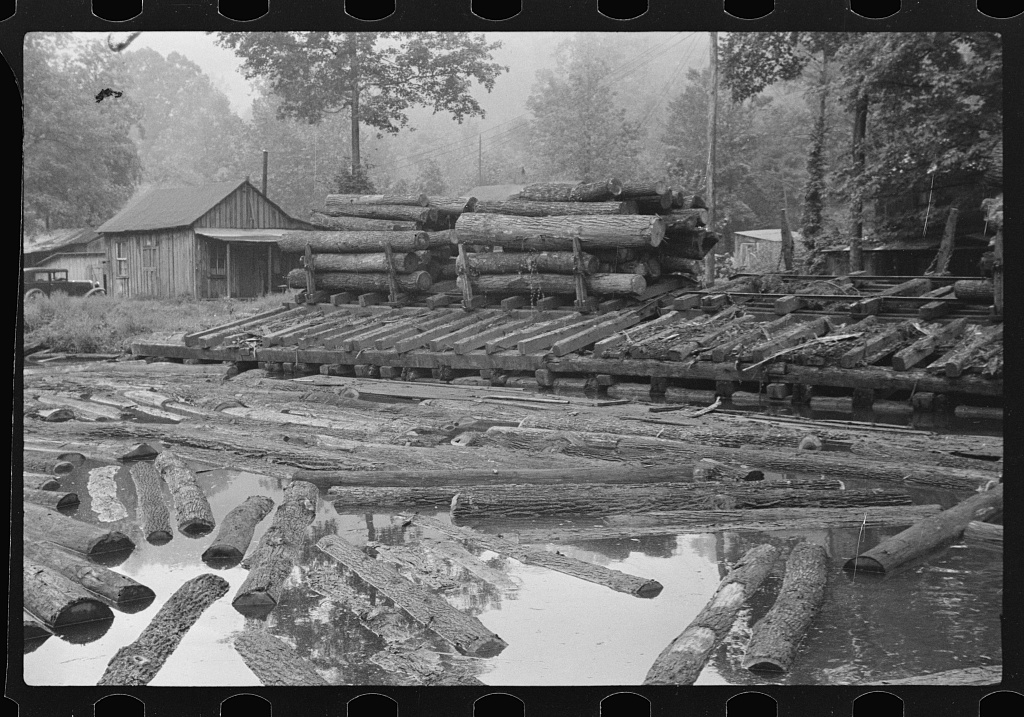
Sawmill and millpond in Erwin, West Virginia, photographed by Marion Post Wolcott in 1938

The mountains and valleys of Appalachia once contained what seemed to be an inexhaustible supply of timber. The poor roads, lack of railroads, and general inaccessibility of the region, however, prevented large-scale logging in most of the region throughout much of the 19th century. While logging firms were established in the Carolinas and the Kentucky River valley before the Civil War, most major firms preferred to harvest the more accessible timber stands in the Midwestern and Northeastern parts of the country. By the 1880s, these stands had been exhausted, and a spike in the demand for lumber forced logging firms to seek out the virgin forests of Appalachia. The first major logging ventures in Appalachia transported logs using mule teams or rivers, the latter method sometimes employing splash dams. In the 1890s, innovations such as the Shay locomotive, the steam-powered loader, and the steam-powered skidder allowed massive harvesting of the most remote forest sections.

Logging in Appalachia reached its peak in the early 20th century, when firms such as the Ritter Lumber Company cut the virgin forests on an alarming scale, leading to the creation of national forests in 1911 and similar state entities to better manage the region's timber resources. Arguably the most successful logging firm in Appalachia was the Georgia Hardwood Lumber Company, established in 1927 and renamed Georgia-Pacific in 1948 when it expanded nationally. Although logging in Appalachia declined as the industry shifted focus to the Pacific Northwest in the 1950s, rising overseas demand in the 1980s brought a resurgence in Appalachian logging. In 1987, 4,810 lumber firms were operating in the region. In the late 1990s, the Appalachian lumber industry was a multibillion-dollar industry, employing 50,000 people in Tennessee, 26,000 in Kentucky, and 12,000 in West Virginia alone. By 1999, 1.4 million acres were extinguished as a result of deforestation by natural resource industries. Pollution from mining processes and disruption of the land ensued numerous environmental issues. Removal of vegetation and other alterations in the land increased erosion and flooding of surrounding areas. Water quality and aquatic life were also affected.

=== Coal mining ===
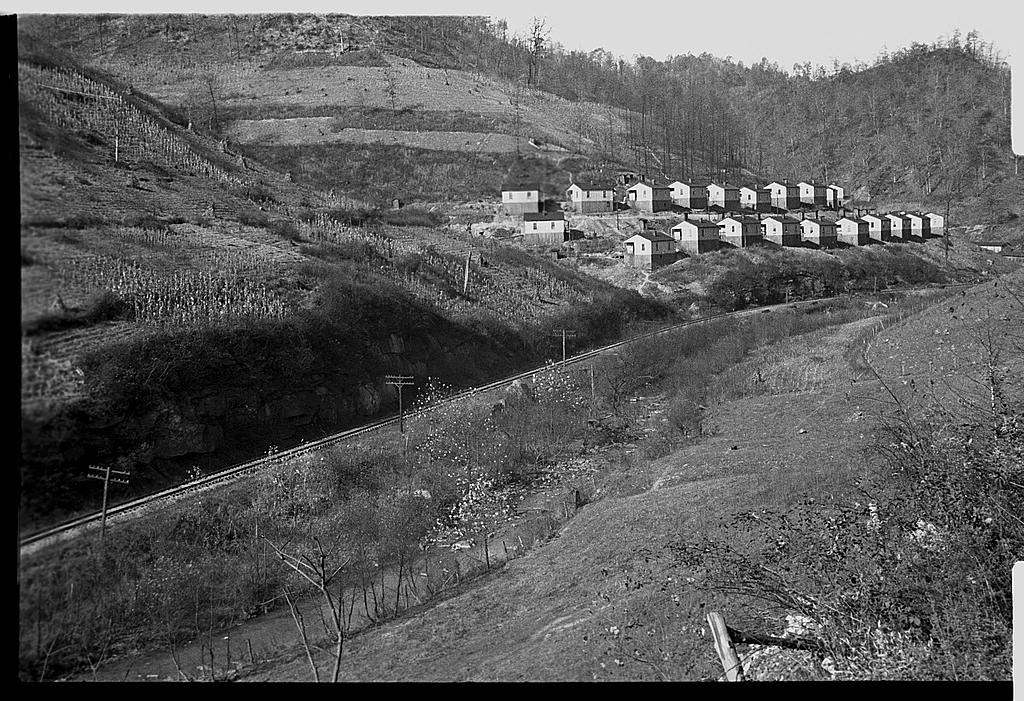
Coal company houses in Jenkins, Kentucky, photographed by Ben Shahn in 1935

Coal mining is the industry most frequently associated with the region in outsiders' minds, due in part to the fact that the region once produced two-thirds of the nation's coal. At present, however, the mining industry employs just 2% of the Appalachian workforce. The region's vast coalfield covers 63,000 square miles (160,000 km^{2}) between northern Pennsylvania and central Alabama, mostly along the Cumberland Plateau and Allegheny Plateau regions. Most mining activity has been concentrated in eastern Kentucky, southwestern Virginia, West Virginia, and western Pennsylvania, with smaller operations in western Maryland, Tennessee and Alabama. The Pittsburgh coal seam, which has produced 13 billion tons of coal since the early 19th century, has been called the world's most valuable mineral deposit. There are over 60 major coal seams in West Virginia and over 80 in eastern Kentucky. Most of the coal mined is bituminous, although significant anthracite deposits exist on the fringe of the region in central Pennsylvania. About two-thirds of Appalachia's coal is produced by underground mining, the rest by surface mining. Mountaintop removal, a form of surface mining, is a highly controversial mining practice in central Appalachia due to its negative impacts on the environment and health of residents.

In the late 19th century, the post-Civil War Industrial Revolution and the expansion of the nation's railroads brought a soaring demand for coal, and mining operations expanded rapidly across Appalachia. Kentucky and West Virginia and Virginia remained Old Stock, with miners recruited from the local population thus maintaining the old culture. In total contrast Western Pennsylvania, hundreds of thousands of workers poured into the region from across the United States and from overseas and western Pennsylvania. Mining corporations gained considerable influence in state and municipal governments, especially as they often owned the entire towns in which the miners lived. The mining industry was vulnerable to economic downturns, however, and booms and busts were frequent, with major booms occurring during World War I and II, and the worst bust occurring during the Great Depression. The Appalachian mining industry also saw some of the nation's bloodiest labor strife between the 1890s and the 1930s. Mining-related injuries and deaths were not uncommon, and ailments such as black lung disease afflicted miners throughout the 20th century. After World War II, innovations in mechanization (such as longwall mining) and competition from oil and natural gas led to a decline in the region's mining operations. Environmental restrictions, such as those placed on high-sulfur coal in the 1980s, brought further mine closures. While with annual earnings of $55,000, Appalachian miners make more than most other local workers, Appalachian coal mining employed just under 50,000 in 2004.

Coal mining has made a comeback in some regions in the early 21st century because of the increased prominence of Consol Energy, based in Pittsburgh. The Quecreek Mine rescue in 2002 and continuing mine subsidence problems in abandoned coal mines in western Pennsylvania as well as the Sago Mine disaster and Upper Big Branch Mine disaster in West Virginia and other regions have also been highlighted in recent times.

=== Manufacturing ===
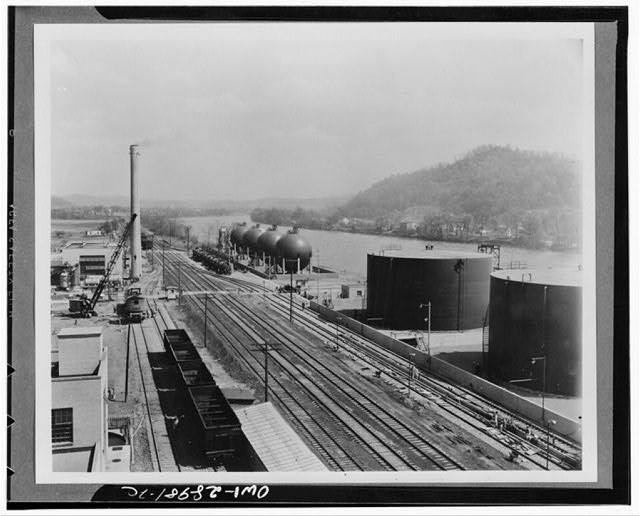
Storage tanks at the Institute plant along the Kanawha River in West Virginia, photographed late 1930s/early 1940s

The manufacturing industry in Appalachia is rooted primarily in the ironworks and steelworks of early Pittsburgh and Birmingham, and in the textile mills that sprang up in North Carolina's Piedmont region in the mid-19th century. Factory construction increased greatly after the Civil War, and the region experienced a manufacturing boom between 1890 and 1930. This economic shift led to a mass migration from small farms and rural areas to large urban centers, causing the populations of cities such as Birmingham, Knoxville, Tennessee, and Asheville, North Carolina, to swell exponentially. Manufacturing in the region suffered a setback during the Great Depression but recovered during World War II and peaked in the 1950s and 1960s. However, difficulties paying retiree benefits, environmental struggles, and the signing of the North American Free Trade Agreement (NAFTA) in 1994 led to a decline in the region's manufacturing operations. Pittsburgh lost 44% of its factory jobs in the 1980s, and between 1970 and 2001, the number of apparel workers in the Appalachian region decreased from 250,000 to 83,000 and the number of textile workers decreased from 275,000 to 193,000.

U.S. Steel, founded in Pittsburgh in 1901, was the world's first corporation with more than a billion dollars in initial capitalization. Another Pittsburgh company, Alcoa, helped establish the nation's aluminum industry in the early 20th century, and has had a significant impact on the economies of western Pennsylvania and east Tennessee. Union Carbide built the world's first petrochemical plant in Clendenin, West Virginia, in 1920, and in subsequent years the Kanawha Valley became known as the "Chemical Capital of the World". Eastman Chemical, also established in 1920, is Tennessee's largest single employer. Companies such as Champion Fibre and Bowater established large pulp operations in Canton, North Carolina, and Greenville, South Carolina, respectively, although the former was dogged by battles with environmentalists throughout the 20th century.

=== Tourism ===
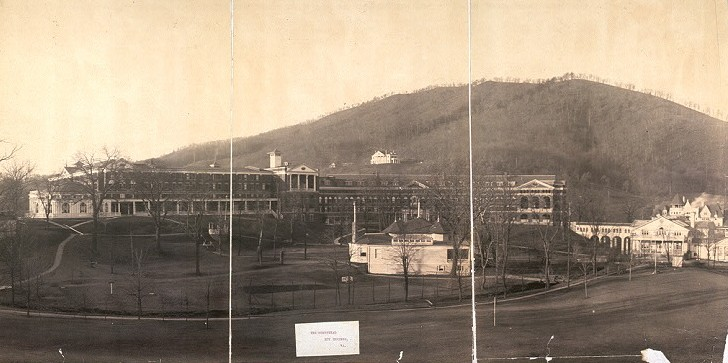
The Homestead, a resort hotel in Bath County, Virginia, photographed in 1903

One of the region's oldest industries, tourism became a more important part of the Appalachian economy in the latter half of the 20th century as mining and manufacturing steadily declined. In 2000–2001, tourism in Appalachia accounted for nearly $30 billion and over 600,000 jobs. The mountain terrain—with its accompanying scenery and outdoor recreational opportunities—provides the region's primary attractions. The region is home to one of the world's most well-known hiking trails (the Appalachian Trail), the nation's most-visited national park (the Great Smoky Mountains National Park), and the nation's most visited national parkway (the Blue Ridge Parkway). The craft industry, including the teaching, selling, and display or demonstration of regional crafts, also accounts for an important part of the Appalachian economy, bringing (for example) over $100 million annually to the economy of western North Carolina and over $80 million to the economy of West Virginia. Important heritage tourism attractions in the region include the Biltmore Estate and the Eastern Band of the Cherokee reservation in North Carolina, Cades Cove in Tennessee, and Harpers Ferry in West Virginia. Important theme parks include Dollywood and Ghost Town Village, both on the periphery of the Great Smoky Mountains.

The mineral-rich mountain springs of the Appalachians—which for many years were thought to have health-restoring qualities—were drawing visitors to the region as early as the 18th century with the establishment of resorts at Hot Springs, Virginia, White Sulphur Springs, West Virginia, and what is now Hot Springs, North Carolina. Along with the mineral springs, the cool and clear air of the range's high elevations provided an escape for lowland elites, and elaborate hotels—such as The Greenbrier in West Virginia and the Balsam Mountain Inn in North Carolina—were built throughout the region's remote valleys and mountain slopes. The end of World War I (which opened up travel opportunities to Europe) and the arrival of the automobile (which changed the nation's vacation habits) led to the demise of all but a few of the region's spa resorts. The establishment of national parks in the 1930s brought an explosion of tourist traffic to the region but created problems with urban sprawl in the various host communities. In the late 20th and early 21st centuries, states have placed greater focus on sustaining tourism while preserving host communities.

=== Poverty ===
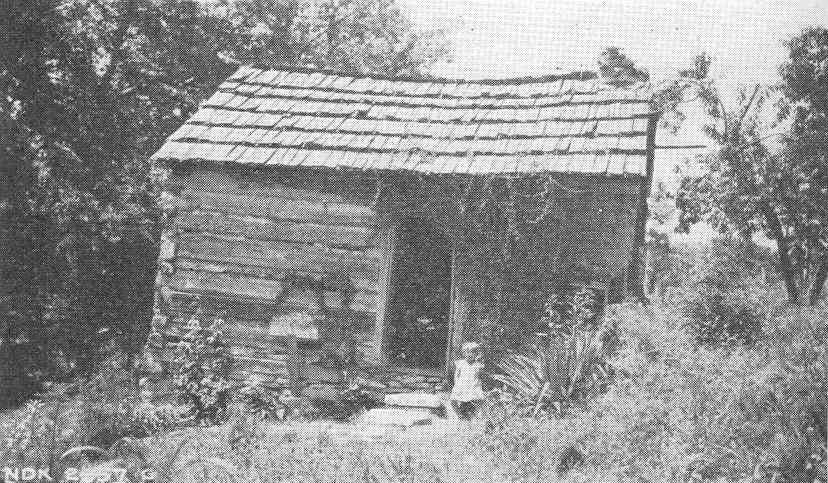
A 1930s-era TVA photograph showing a young girl in front of her family's house in the lower Clinch River valley in East Tennessee

Poverty had plagued Appalachia for many years but was not brought to the attention of the rest of the United States until 1940, when James Agee and Walker Evans published Let Us Now Praise Famous Men, a book that documented families in Appalachia during the Great Depression in words and photos. In 1963, John F. Kennedy established the President's Appalachian Regional Commission. His successor, Lyndon B. Johnson, crystallized Kennedy's efforts in the form of the Appalachian Regional Commission, which passed into law in 1965.

In Appalachia, severe poverty and desolation were paired with the necessity for careful cultural sensitivity. Many Appalachian people feared that the birth of a new modernized Appalachia would lead to the death of their traditional values and heritage. Because of the isolation of the region, Appalachian people had been unable to catch up to the modernization that lowlanders had achieved. In the 1960s, many people in Appalachia had a standard of living comparable to Third World countries. Lyndon B. Johnson declared a War on Poverty while standing on the front porch of an Inez, Kentucky, home whose residents had been suffering from a long-ignored problem. The Appalachian Regional Development Act of 1965 stated:

The Appalachian region of the United States, while abundant in natural resources and rich in potential, lags behind the rest of the Nation... its people have not shared properly in the Nation's prosperity.

Since the creation of the Appalachian Regional Commission (ARC) in 1965, the region has seen dramatic progress. New roads, schools, health care facilities, water and sewer systems, and other improvements have brought a better life to many Appalachian residents. In the 1960s, 219 counties in the 13-state Appalachian Region were considered economically distressed. Now that list has been cut by more than half, to 82 counties, but these are "hard-core" pockets of poverty, seemingly impervious to all efforts at improving their lot. Martin County, Kentucky, the site of Johnson's 1964 speech, is one such county still ranked as "distressed" by the ARC. As of 2000, the per capita income in Martin County was $10,650, and 37% of its residents lived below the poverty line.

Like Johnson, President Bill Clinton brought attention to the remaining areas of poverty in Appalachia. On July 5, 1999, he made a public statement concerning the situation in Tyner, Kentucky. Clinton told the crowd:

I'm here to make a simple point. This is the time to bring more jobs and investment to parts of the country that have not participated in this time of prosperity. Any work that can be done by anybody in America can be done in Appalachia.

The region's poverty has been documented often since the early 1960s. John Cohen documents rural lifestyle and culture in The High Lonesome Sound, while photojournalist Earl Dotter has been visiting and documenting poverty, healthcare and mining in Appalachia for nearly forty years. Another photojournalist, Shelby Lee Adams, has been photographing Appalachian families and lifestyle for decades.

Poverty has caused health problems in the region. The diseases of despair, including the opioid epidemic in the United States, and some diseases of poverty are prevalent in Appalachia.

=== Tax revenue and absentee land ownership ===
In 1982 a seven-volume study conducted by the Appalachian Land Ownership Task Force was issued by the Appalachian Regional Commission which investigated the issue of absentee land ownership. The study covered 80 counties in six states approximating the area designated "Southern Appalachia" as defined by Thomas R. Ford's 1962 work. The states selected were Alabama (15 counties), Kentucky (12 counties), North Carolina (12 counties), Tennessee (14 counties), Virginia (12 counties), and West Virginia (15 counties).

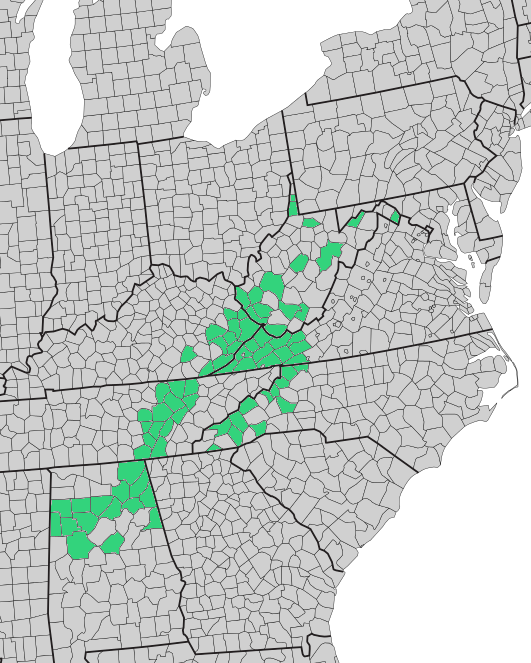
Map showing the 80 counties included in the 1982 report by the Appalachian Land Ownership Task Force

In its summary the report stated that "over 55,000 parcels of property in 80 counties were studied, representing some 20,000,000 acres of land and mineral rights..." It found that "41% of the 20 million acres of land and minerals...are held by only 50 private owners and 10 government agencies. The federal government is the single largest owner in Appalachia, holding over 2,000,000 acres." The study found that the extractive industries, i.e., timber, coal, etc., were "greatly under-assessed for property tax purposes. Over 75% of the mineral owners in this survey pay under 25 cents per acre in property taxes." In the major coal counties surveyed the average tax per ton of known coal reserves is only $.0002 (1/50th of a cent). The government-held lands are tax-exempt, but the government makes a payment in lieu of taxes, which is usually less than the normal tax rates.

"Taken together, the failure to tax minerals adequately, the underassessment of surface lands, and the revenue loss from concentrated federal holdings has a marked impact on local governments in Appalachia. The effect, essentially, is to produce a situation in which a) the small owners carry a disproportionate share of the tax burden; b) counties depend upon federal and state funds to provide revenues, while the large, corporate and absentee owners of the region's resources go relatively tax-free; and c) citizens face a poverty of needed services despite the presence in their counties of taxable property wealth, especially in the form of coal and other natural resources."

In 2013, a similar study that concentrated solely on West Virginia found that 25 private owners hold 17.6% of the state's private land of 13 million acres. The federal government owns 1,133,587 acres in West Virginia, 7.4% of the total state acreage of 15,410,560 acres. In 11 counties the top ten absentee landowners own 41% to almost 72% of the private land in each county.

=== Appalachian Regional Commission ===
The Appalachian Regional Commission (ARC) was created by the U.S. Congress in 1965 to bring poor areas of the 13 U.S. states of the main (southern) range of the Appalachians into the mainstream of the American economy. The commission is a partnership of federal, state, and local governments, and was created to promote economic growth and improve the quality of life in the region. The region as defined by the ARC includes 420 counties, including all of West Virginia; counties in 12 other states: Alabama, Georgia, Kentucky, Maryland, Mississippi, New York, North Carolina, Ohio, Pennsylvania, South Carolina, Tennessee, and Virginia; and also eight cities in Virginia, where state law makes cities administratively separate from counties. The ARC is a planning, research, advocacy and funding organization; it does not have any governing powers.

The ARC's geographic range of coverage was defined broadly to cover as many economically underdeveloped areas as possible; it extends well beyond the area usually thought of as "Appalachia". For instance, parts of Alabama and Mississippi were included in the commission because of problems with unemployment and poverty similar to those in Appalachia proper, and the ARC region extends into the Northeastern states, which are not traditionally considered part of Appalachia culturally (though a "northern Appalachia" identity has emerged in recent times in parts of both NY and PA, particularly in rural areas). More recently, the Youngstown, Ohio, region was declared part of Appalachia by the ARC due to the collapse of the steel industry in the region in the early 1980s and the continuing unemployment problems in the region since, though aside from Columbiana County, Ohio, the Youngstown DMA is not traditionally or culturally considered part of the region. The ARC's wide scope also grew out of the "pork barrel" phenomenon, as politicians from outside the traditional Appalachia area saw a new way to bring home federal money to their areas. However, former Ohio governor Bob Taft has stated, "What is good for Appalachia is good for all of Ohio."

=== Transportation ===
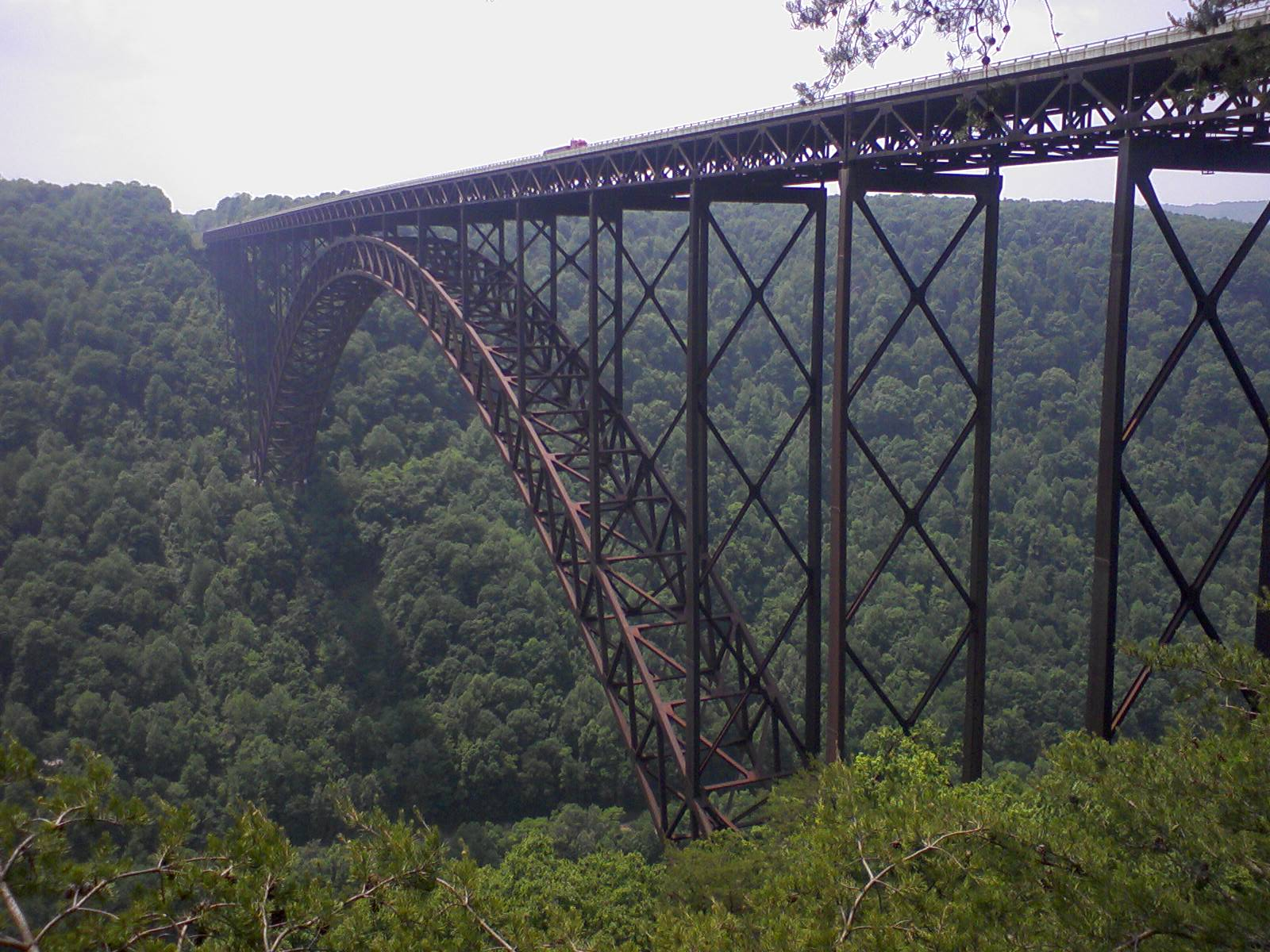
The New River Gorge Bridge in West Virginia is the longest steel span in the western hemisphere and at 876 feet (267 m), the third highest in the United States.

Transportation has been the most challenging and expensive issue in Appalachia since the arrival of the first European settlers in the 18th century. Except the 1 October 1940 opening of the Pennsylvania Turnpike, the region's mountainous terrain continuously thwarted major federal intervention attempts at major road construction until the 1970s. This left large parts of the region virtually isolated and slowing economic growth. Before the Civil War, major cities in the region were connected via wagon roads to lowland areas, and flatboats provided an important means for transporting goods out of the region. By 1900, railroads connected most of the region with the rest of the nation, although the poor roads made travel beyond railroad hubs difficult. When the Appalachian Regional Commission was created in 1965, road construction was considered its most important initiative, and in subsequent decades the commission spent more on road construction than all other projects combined.

The effort to connect Appalachia with the outside world has required numerous civil engineering feats. Millions of tons of rock were removed to build road segments such as Interstate 40 through the Pigeon River Gorge at the Tennessee-North Carolina state line and U.S. Route 23 in Letcher County, Kentucky. Large tunnels were built through mountain slopes at Cumberland Gap in 1996 to speed up travel along U.S. Route 25E, which acts as a regional arterial connecting Appalachia to the East Coast and the Great Lakes regions. The New River Gorge Bridge in West Virginia, completed in 1977, was the longest and is now the fourth-longest single-arch bridge in the world. The Blue Ridge Parkway's Linn Cove Viaduct, the construction of which required the assembly of 153 pre-cast segments 4,000 feet (1,200 m) up the slopes of Grandfather Mountain, has been designated a historic civil engineering landmark.

== Physiographic provinces ==
The six physiographic provinces that in whole or in part are commonly treated as components of Appalachia are:

1. Appalachian Plateau
2. Allegheny Mountains
3. Ridge-and-Valley Appalachians
4. Great Appalachian Valley
5. Blue Ridge Mountains
6. Piedmont

== In popular culture ==
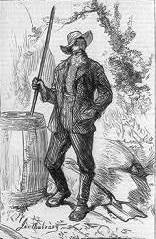
"The Moonshine Man of Kentucky", an 1877 illustration from Harper's Weekly

Depictions of Appalachia and its inhabitants in popular media are typically negative, making the region an object of humor, derision, and social concern. Ledford writes, "Always part of the mythical South, Appalachia continues to languish backstage in the American drama, still dressed, in the popular mind at least, in the garments of backwardness, violence, poverty, and hopelessness." Otto argues that comic strips Li'l Abner by Al Capp and Barney Google by Billy DeBeck, which both began in 1934, caricatured the laziness and weakness for "corn squeezin's" (moonshine) of these "hillbillies". The popular 1960s Andy Griffith Show and The Beverly Hillbillies on television and James Dickey's 1970 novel Deliverance perpetuated the stereotype, although the region itself underwent so many changes after 1945 that it scarcely resembles the comic images.

- English composer Frederick Delius wrote a theme and variations entitled Appalachia; he first composed this music, subtitled "Variations on an Old Slave Song with final chorus", in 1896.
- The Little Shepherd of Kingdom Come (1903), The Trail of the Lonesome Pine (1908), and other early 20th-century novels of John Fox Jr., set in the Appalachian town of Big Stone Gap, Virginia, and surrounding areas, gave readers an image of frontier life in Appalachia and were made into popular films. Fox himself graduated from Harvard and was a bon vivant newspaperman in New York City. He returned home to the Cumberland Mountains of Tennessee to write his stories because of poor health.
- Some comic strips often featured Appalachia, especially "Li'l Abner" by Al Capp. Inge notes that this comic strip, which ran 1934–77, largely ignored religion, politics, blacks and the Civil War, but instead focused its humor on the morality of Dogpatch, examining its memorable and often eccentric people who typically relied on violence to control the social order, and held deep to their faith in land, home, self-sufficiency, and antipathy to outsiders. Arnold finds that starting with World War II Capp increasingly emphasized sex and violence.
- Appalachian Spring (1944) is the name of a musical composition by Aaron Copland and a ballet of the same name by Martha Graham. Copland did not intend for his music, which he composed for Graham and which incorporates Shaker melodies, to have an Appalachian theme. Graham gave the work its name; her ballet told the story of a young couple living on the frontier in western Pennsylvania.
- Author Catherine Marshall wrote Christy (1967), loosely based on her mother's years as a teacher in the Appalachian region. The novel was highly popular and became the basis of a short-lived television series of the same name in 1994.
- The 1972 film Deliverance takes place in southern Appalachia. The film perpetuated extremely negative stereotypes about White Southerners.
- The Waltons was a 1972–1981 television show that depicted a rural Virginia family during the Great Depression through World War II.
- "Face of Appalachia" is a song that appeared first on the album Tarzana Kid by John Sebastian in 1974. The song, co-written by Sebastian and Lowell George, was described by Joel Canfield as follows: "Sebastian's lyrics weave a heart-rending picture of an old man's struggle to impart his childhood memories to his grandson; memories of places and people who no longer exist; of an era long gone." Cover versions of the song have been recorded by Valerie Carter (1977), Wendy Matthews (1992) and Julie Miller (1997).
- The motion pictures Where the Lilies Bloom (1974) and Coal Miner's Daughter (1980) attempt an accurate portrayal of life in Appalachia which stresses the tensions between Appalachian traditions and the values of urbanized America.
- Alan Hovhaness in 1985 composed a tone poem named To the Appalachian Mountains (Symphony no. 60).
- Large-format photographer Shelby Lee Adams, himself a son of Appalachian emigrants, has portrayed the Appalachian family life sympathetically in several books (1993–2003).
- The 1999 drama film October Sky focuses on the true story of NASA engineer Homer Hickam and his peers known as the Rocket Boys, who constructed a jet-propulsed rocket in the declining Appalachian coal town of Coalwood, West Virginia as a result of the Space Race.
- The novel Prodigal Summer (2000) by Barbara Kingsolver explores the ecology of the region and how the removal of the predators, wolves and coyotes, affected the environment.
- Songcatcher (2000) takes place in rural Appalachia in 1907 and features the "lost" ballads of the Scots-Irish brought over in the 19th century and a musicologist's quest to preserve them.
- Stranger with a Camera (2000) is a documentary film from Appalshop about the representation of Appalachian communities by outsiders in film and video.
- Much of the popular book series The Hunger Games (2008) is set in "an area that used to be called Appalachia" which is referred to in the book as District 12. Much of the surroundings and culture reflect present-day Appalachia, such as reliance on coal mining as an industry.
- The 2013 film Out of the Furnace is the story of two brothers living in a dying Appalachian Pennsylvania town, struggling for jobs, who get wrapped up in the world of meth-dealing in the mountains.
- Hillbilly Elegy: A Memoir of a Family and Culture in Crisis is a 2016 memoir by JD Vance that opines on the Appalachian region and people, drawing from the Ohio-born author's view of his extended family in Kentucky. While the book's portrayal of Appalachia was met with controversy and derision from many Appalachians, it was made into a 2020 film directed by Ron Howard.
- Fallout 76 (2018) is set in a retrofuturistic, post-nuclear Appalachia, with some of its story arcs exploring the social and economic impact of widespread automation, labor struggles, and anti-government activism, drawing on the region's real history, such as the Battle of Blair Mountain.
- Author Barbara Kingsolver seeks to redress Appalachian stereotypes in her novel Demon Copperhead (2022), a retelling of Charles Dickens' David Copperfield that explores the opioid crisis in the region.
- Author Emilee Hackney's debut 2026 memoir All That's Unseen narrates her life growing up in the town of Tazewell, Virginia. The memoir also challenges some of the negative stereotypes often attributed to Appalachian people.

== See also ==
- Appalachian studies
- Appalachian Americans
- Appalachian English
- Appalachian Mountains
- Appalachian stereotypes
- Social and economic stratification in Appalachia
- Appalachian Center for Wilderness Medicine
- Appalachian Ohio
- Childbirth in rural Appalachia
- Environmental justice and coal mining in Appalachia
- Museum of Appalachia
- Ozark culture
- Subranges of the Appalachian Mountains
- Upland South

== Sources ==
- Abramson, Rudy, and Haskell, Jean, editors (2006). Encyclopedia of Appalachia, University of Tennessee Press. ISBN 1-57233-456-8 online
- Becker, Jane S. Inventing Tradition: Appalachia and the Construction of an American Folk, 1930–1940 (1998).
- Caudill, Harry M. (1962). Night Comes to the Cumberlands. Little, Brown and Company. ISBN 0-316-13212-8.
- Davis, Donald Edward. Where There Are Mountains: An Environmental History of the Southern Appalachians, 2000.
- Dotter, Earl. "Coalfield Generations: Health, Mining and the Environment" Southern Spaces, July 16, 2008.
- Drake, Richard B. A History of Appalachia (2001)
- Eller, Ronald D. Miners, Millhands, and Mountaineers: Industrialization of the Appalachian South, 1880–1930 1982.
- Ford, Thomas R. ed. The Southern Appalachian Region: A Survey. (1967), includes highly detailed statistics.
- Kephart, Horace (1922). Our Southern Highlanders (New and revised ed.). Macmillan. ISBN 0-87049-203-9. text online
- Inscoe, John C. Movie-Made Appalachia: History, Hollywood, and the Highland South (U of North Carolina Press, 2020) online review
- Lee, Tom, "Southern Appalachia's Nineteenth-Century Bright Tobacco Boom: Industrialization, Urbanization, and the Culture of Tobacco", Agricultural History 88 (Spring 2014), 175–206. online
- Lewis, Ronald L. (1998). Transforming the Appalachian Countryside: Railroads, Deforestation, and Social Change in West Virginia, 1880–1920. Archived from the original on October 20, 2012 – via Questia.
- Light, Melanie and Ken Light (2006). Coal Hollow. Berkeley: University of California Press. ISBN 978-0-520-24654-6
- Noe, Kenneth W. and Shannon H. Wilson, Civil War in Appalachia (1997)
- Obermiller, Phillip J., Thomas E. Wagner, and E. Bruce Tucker, editors (2000). Appalachian Odyssey: Historical Perspectives on the Great Migration. Westport, CT: Praeger. ISBN 0-275-96851-0
- Olson, Ted (1998). Blue Ridge Folklife. University Press of Mississippi. ISBN 1-57806-023-0
- Pudup, Mary Beth, Dwight B. Billings, and Altina L. Waller, eds. Appalachia in the Making: The Mountain South in the Nineteenth Century. (1995).
- Slap, Andrew L., (ed.) (2010). Reconstructing Appalachia: The Civil War's Aftermath Lexington, KY: University Press of Kentucky.
- Stewart, Bruce E. (ed.) (2012). Blood in the Hills: A History of Violence in Appalachia. Lexington, KY: University Press of Kentucky.
- Walls, David (1977). "On the Naming of Appalachia" Archived May 28, 2010, at the Wayback Machine An Appalachian Symposium. Edited by J. W. Williamson. Boone, NC: Appalachian State University Press.
- Williams, John Alexander (2002). Appalachia: A History. Archived from the original on October 18, 2012 – via Questia.
- Woodard, Colin American Nations: A History of the Eleven Rival Regional Cultures of North America (2011)
