= Our Southern Highlanders =

Book

Our Southern Highlanders: A Narrative of Adventure in the Southern Appalachians and a Study of Life Among the Mountaineers is a book written by American author Horace Kephart (1862–1931), first published in 1913 and revised in 1922. Inspired by the years Kephart spent among the inhabitants of the remote Hazel Creek region of the Great Smoky Mountains, the book provides one of the earliest realistic portrayals of life in the rural Appalachian Mountains and one of the first serious analyses of Appalachian culture. While modern historians and writers have criticized Our Southern Highlanders for focusing too much on sensationalistic aspects of mountain culture, the book was an important departure from the previous century's local color writings and their negative distortions of mountain people.

== Setting ==
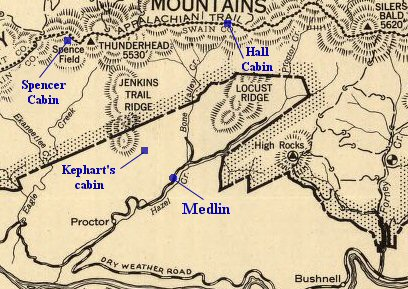
1940 map of the southwestern Smokies, modified to show points (in blue) mentioned frequently in Our Southern Highlanders

Hazel Creek originates on the slopes of Silers Bald in the Great Smoky Mountains and drops 4,000 feet (1,200 m) over its 18-mile (29 km) route to the Little Tennessee River, draining much of the southwestern part of the range along the way. The village of Medlin was located where modern Haw Gap Branch ("Haw Creek" on old maps) empties into Hazel Creek (the townsite is now Campsite 84 at the junction of Jenkins Ridge Trail and the Hazel Creek Trail). Kephart's cabin was located along Little Fork, a tributary of Sugar Fork, the latter in turn being a tributary of Haw Gap Branch. In 1904, the nearest railroad depot was 16 miles (26 km) away at Bushnell, a small town at the confluence of the Tuckasegee River and the Little Tennessee (now submerged by Fontana Lake).

Part of Our Southern Highlanders takes place atop the main crest of the Western Smokies between Gregory Bald and Silers Bald, which at the time was coated by a series of highland meadows used as livestock pastures during the growing season when bottomlands were needed for crops. Each pasture had a respective cabin for its summertime herdsman, namely (from west to east) the Russell cabin at what is now Russell Field, the Spencer cabin at what is now Spence Field, Hall cabin atop what is now Big Chestnut Bald (in the vicinity of the modern Derrick Knob shelter), and a cabin at Siler's Meadow (just off the summit of Silers Bald). The Hall cabin mentioned often by Kephart should not be confused with the Hall cabin presently located at the end of the Bone Valley Trail, although both were built by Jesse "Crate" Hall.

== Background ==
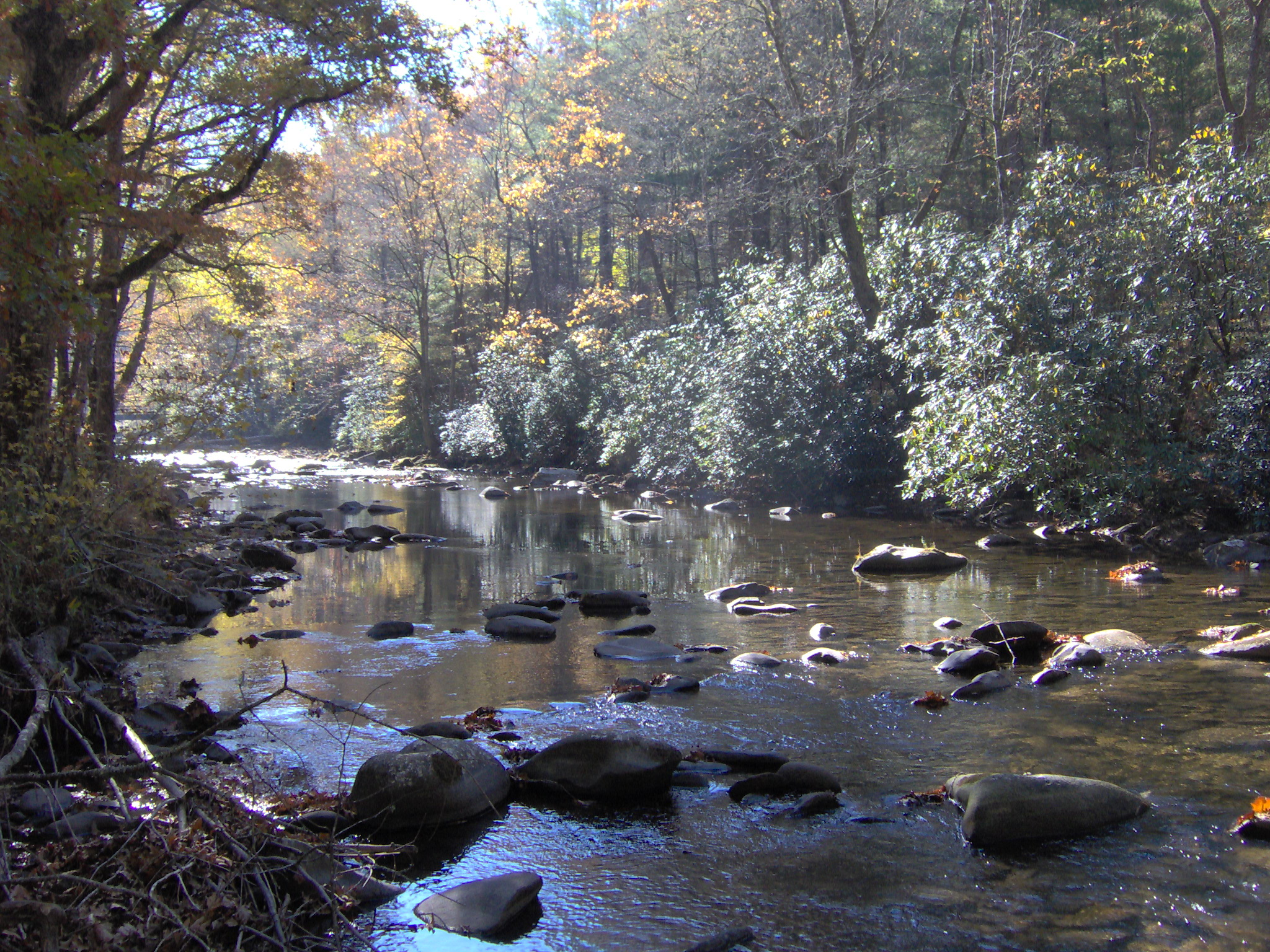
Hazel Creek flowing through what was once the site of Proctor, North Carolina, setting of Kephart's book Our Southern Highlanders (1913–1922)

Kephart was born in Pennsylvania, although his family moved to Iowa when he was still a child. Iowa was still very sparsely populated at the time, allowing Kephart to gain a lifelong appreciation for pioneer life. Kephart was trained as a librarian at Cornell University, and in 1890 was named head librarian at the St. Louis Mercantile Library. Although a successful librarian, Kephart eventually became disenchanted with his homelife and job in the early 1900s, started drinking more often, and began spending more and more time in the nearby Ozark wilderness. In 1903, he separated from his wife, and the following year suffered a nervous breakdown.

While recuperating at his father's home in Dayton, Ohio, Kephart used a map to seek out the nearest substantial wilderness area, which he determined to be the Great Smoky Mountains, a rugged range straddling the border between Tennessee and North Carolina. In August 1904, he moved to North Carolina with plans to venture into the range.

After a short stay in Dillsboro, North Carolina, Kephart secured usage of a cabin at an abandoned copper mine in the Hazel Creek Valley in the southwest corner of the Great Smokies range. On October 30, 1904, he arrived at Bushnell very ill (suffering from tuberculosis and possibly alcohol withdrawal). He was met at Bushnell by legendary bear hunter Granville Calhoun (1875–1978), and the two made a 16-mile (26 km) muleback trek to Calhoun's house in the hamlet of Medlin, near the middle of the Hazel Creek Valley. After recovering, Kephart moved on to his new cabin (just north of Medlin), where he lived until 1907. Kephart then spent several years traveling around Southern Appalachia before permanently settling in Bryson City, North Carolina in 1910.

== Publication ==
The first edition of Our Southern Highlanders was published by the Outing Publishing Company of New York in 1913, and sold about 10,000 copies. In 1921, MacMillan acquired the book's publishing rights, and released a revised edition the following year complete with several new chapters ("The Snake-Stick Man," "A Raid into the Sugarlands," and "The Killing of Hol Rose"), several new photographs, and a subtitle. MacMillan reprinted the book eight times, the eighth coming in 1967. In the 1970s, the University of Tennessee Press reissued the book with an introduction (including a brief Kephart biography) by Bryson City writer George Ellison.

== Summary ==
The bulk of Our Southern Highlanders is based on observations Kephart made while at Hazel Creek (1904–1907), although several chapters added in 1922 were based on events that occurred later when Kephart lived in Bryson City. Chapters 9 ("The Snake-Stick Man") and 10 ("A Raid into the Sugarlands") were based on events that occurred in 1919. Chapter 11 ("The Killing of Hol Rose") was based on events that occurred in late 1920.

- Chapter I, "Something Hidden; Go and Find It," discusses the remoteness and ruggedness of the Southern Appalachian Mountains, the lack of realistic literature regarding its inhabitants, and gives a brief history of the region.
- Chapter II, "The Back of Beyond," gives a description of Medlin and discusses how the mountaineers have adapted to their environment, the difficulties in farming the rugged terrain, and grazing in the highland meadows.

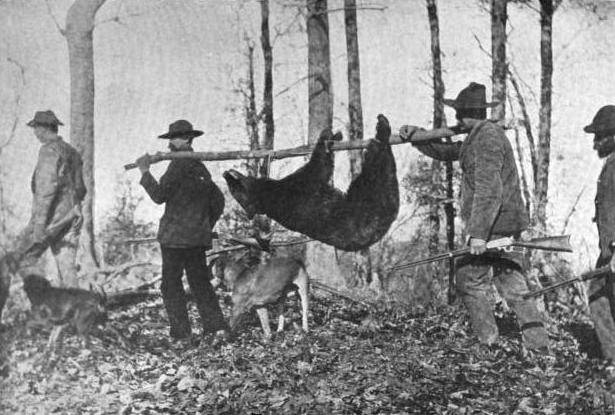
Photograph from Chapter IV showing bear hunters and quarry

- Chapter III, "The Great Smoky Mountains," discusses the topography, geology, wildlife and plant life of the Great Smokies range. Kephart also relates a story by a "Mr. and Mrs. Ferris" who ventured across the nearly-impassable crest of the central and eastern Smokies to Mount Guyot in search of plant specimens. He also discusses the harshness of the highland meadows, and recounts a story of 17 cattle freezing to death at Silers Meadow.
- Chapter IV, "A Bear Hunt in the Smokies," recounts a bear hunt undertaken by Kephart and several Hazel Creek natives. The party includes Granville Calhoun, a Bone Valley resident named Bill Cope ("the hunchback"), John Baker "Little John" Cable, Jr. (1855–1939), Matt Hyde, and Andrew Jackson "Doc" Jones (1851–1935). The chapter begins at Hall cabin amidst a windstorm and ends with the successful killing of a bear. This chapter contains one of the earliest references to the Appalachian folk song Cumberland Gap.
- Chapter V, "Moonshine Land," discusses Kephart's initial curiosity about moonshining, and recounts one mountaineer's justification for the practice.
- Chapter VI, "Ways That Are Dark," continues Kephart's discussion of moonshining, particularly how it is made in Southern Appalachia, the typical size and settings of stills, etc.
- Chapter VII, "A Leaf from the Past," traces the roots of moonshining to the British Isles, and explains how the practice made its way to Southern Appalachia.
- Chapter VIII, "Blockaders and the Revenue," discusses the ongoing conflict between moonshiners and federal revenue agents.

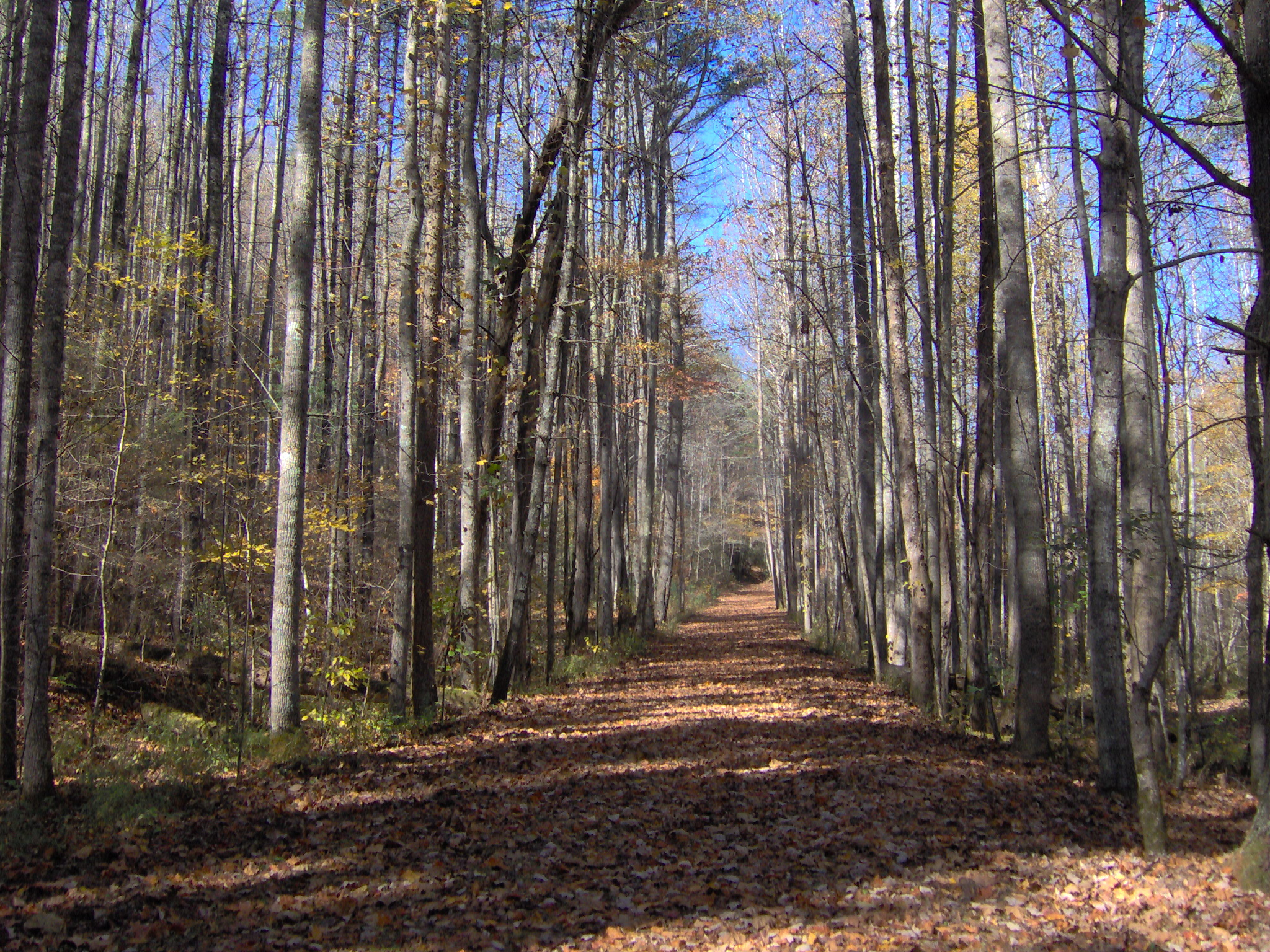
The Hazel Creek Trail approaching the former site of Medlin

- Chapter IX, "The Snake-Stick Man," tells the story of a federal revenue agent whom Kephart calls "Mr. Quick" (an alias). Quick, who has a hobby of carving sticks into the form of snakes, has a polymathic expertise that Kephart finds most impressive. He is in the area to investigate illegal liquor sales at the nearby Cherokee Reservation.
- Chapter X, "A Raid into the Sugarlands," recounts a manhunt led by "Mr. Quick" into the Sugarlands, a remote valley south of Gatlinburg on the Tennessee side of the Smokies. The chapter includes an anachronistic story about a mountaineer named "Jasper Fenn" (based on a real-life Sugarlander named Davis Bracken, who lived near what is now the Chimneys Campground) who claimed to have read a copy of Our Southern Highlanders given to him by the Pi Beta Phi settlement school in Gatlinburg.
- Chapter XI, "The Killing of Hol Rose," recounts the killing of revenuer James Holland "Hol" Rose by J.E. "Babe" Burnett and Burnett's subsequent trial.
- Chapter XII, "The Outlander and the Native," discusses the mountaineers' attitudes toward outsiders.
- Chapter XIII, "The People of the Hills," describes the mountaineers' typical physical traits, work ethic, their ability to endure harsh conditions, and their general preference for mountain life over urban life.
- Chapter XIV, "The Land of Do Without," discusses the mountaineers' homelife, their manner of dress, the prevalence of poverty and the mountaineers' scorn of charity.
- Chapter XV, "Home Folks and Neighbor People," discusses gender and family roles, religion and funerary rights, music and dancing, and Christmas and New Year’s Day customs among the mountain people.

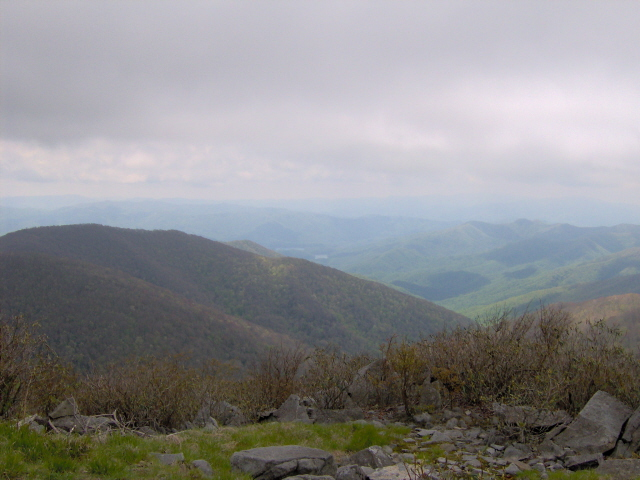
The upper Eagle Creek Valley, the home of moonshiner Quill Rose, viewed from Thunderhead Mountain

- Chapter XVI, "The Mountain Dialect," discusses mountain speech. Kephart's observations in this chapter mark one of the first serious analyses of the Southern Appalachian dialect, and one of the first to label it a distinct dialect rather than merely the speech habits of the uneducated. While Kephart overemphasizes archaic "Elizabethan" traits in the dialect, linguists acknowledge his keen observations and painstaking scholarship in this analysis.
- Chapter XVII, "The Law of the Wilderness," discusses the mountaineers' penchant for self-reliance and individualism, the importance of family bonds, and attitudes toward government.
- Chapter XVIII, "The Blood-Feud," discusses Appalachian clan feuding, its typical causes, and how it compares to other cultural clan feuds, such as Corsican vendettas.
- Chapter XIV, "Who Are the Mountaineers?", traces the Scotch-Irish roots and migration patterns of the Southern Appalachian mountaineers, and emphasizes that the Appalachian culture is a distinct culture spread across the highlands of several states.
- Chapter XX, "When the Sleeper Awakes," discusses how encroaching commercialism and modernity, brought to the region by logging firms and other corporations, threatened to erode the mountain culture.

== Criticism ==
Criticism of Our Southern Highlanders typically revolves around Kephart's focus on backwoods outlaws or people living in extreme poverty while paying scant attention to the region's middle class landowners and town dwellers, many of whom would not have been too far out of place in mainstream America. Historian John Puckett wrote that Our Southern Highlanders "projected a jaundiced view of the region" in which the mountaineers were portrayed as "'half-wild' creatures." Kephart scholar Gary Carden has argued that while Kephart was an excellent observer, he had a tendency to "romanticize" the mountaineers' more offensive qualities. Hazel Creek historian (and native) Duane Oliver recalled that Our Southern Highlanders "angered" many Hazel Creek residents for the manner in which it portrayed them, but argues that, as a writer, it was natural that Kephart would seek out the region's more colorful personalities.

Other critics take issue with Kephart's notion that radical isolation in Southern Appalachia had created a race of "contemporary ancestors"— relics of the nation's pioneer period who were largely untouched by modernity— a belief popularized by Berea College president William Goodell Frost in the late 1890s. Historian Durwood Dunn, in his seminal work on the history of Cades Cove (a region on the Tennessee side of the Smokies culturally related to Hazel Creek), lambasted Kephart's constant emphasis on isolation in Southern Appalachia, and argued that people in typical mountain communities were constantly intermingling with people in nearby cities via mail, travel, and (later) telephones. Dunn also argued that, contrary to popular belief, the populations of mountain communities were in constant flux, and that new migrants would have consistently brought new ideas and customs to these communities, regardless of their isolation.

== Legacy ==
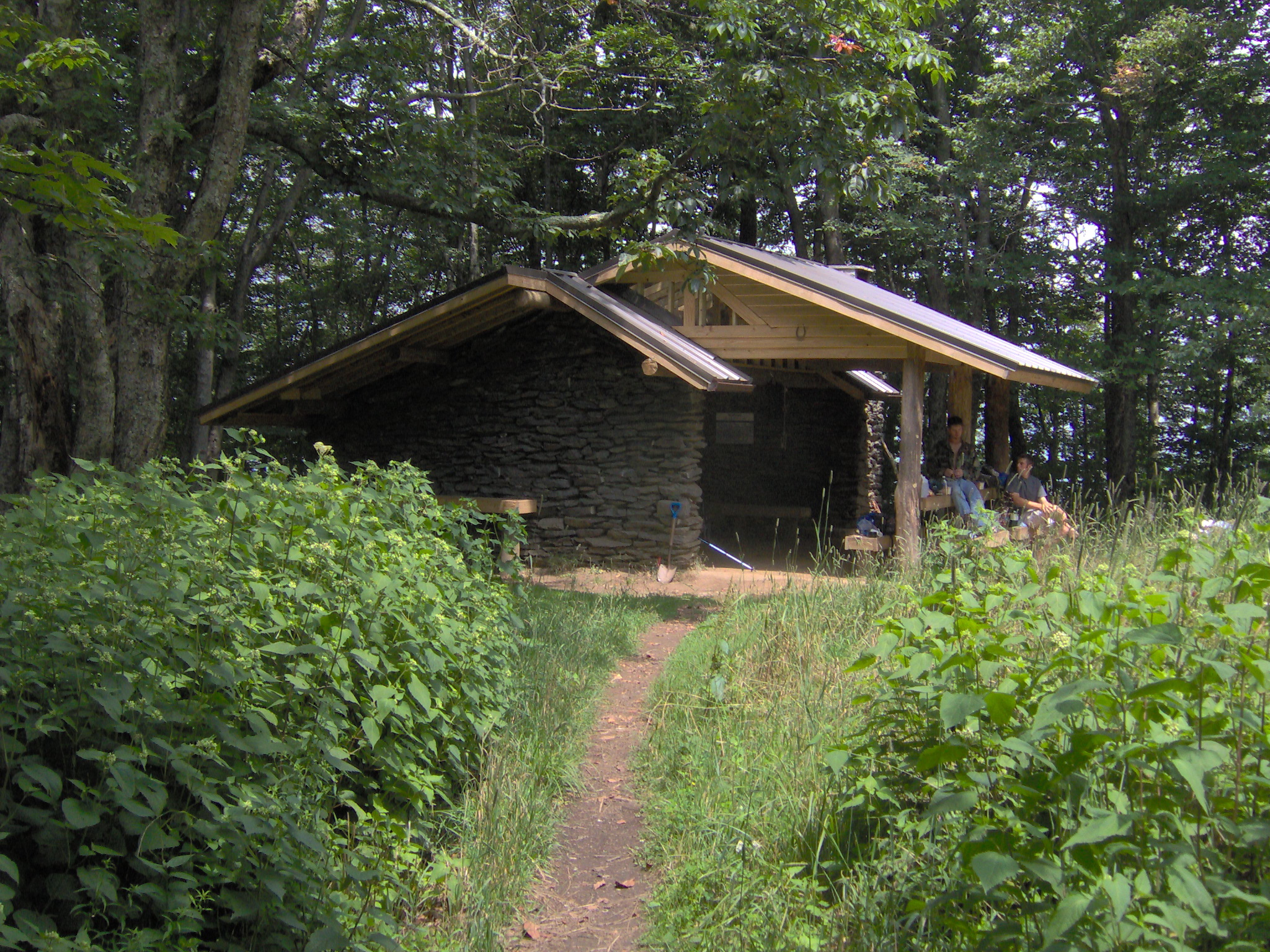
The Appalachian Trail approaching the Derrick Knob shelter, near where Hall cabin once stood

Our Southern Highlanders was the "seminal work" of Appalachian nonfiction, and provided a foundation for numerous other studies of Appalachian culture over subsequent decades. In spite of the book's shortcomings, its keen observations went a long way toward demystifying the rural people of Southern Appalachia. According to Bryson City author George Ellison, no book devoted to Southern Appalachia is "more widely known, read, and respected" than Our Southern Highlanders.

Kephart's years in the Hazel Creek valley had a profound impact on his life. He abandoned his career as a librarian, and focused solely on writing about outdoor life and studying the people of Southern Appalachia. While he left Hazel Creek in 1907 to tour the Southern Appalachian region, he eventually returned to nearby Bryson City in 1910, where he lived for the rest of his life. He spent much of the 1920s advocating the creation of the Great Smoky Mountains National Park, which opened shortly after his death. Kephart was also instrumental in mapping the route of the park's Appalachian Trail segment, which was completed in the 1930s. The trail closely follows the Tennessee-North Carolina border, and traverses many of the highland pastures (most of which have been reclaimed by a young forest) that figured prominently in Our Southern Highlanders. In 2007, park archaeologists uncovered the foundation of Hall cabin during a project to revamp the nearby Derrick Knob shelter.
