= Hazel Creek (Great Smoky Mountains) =

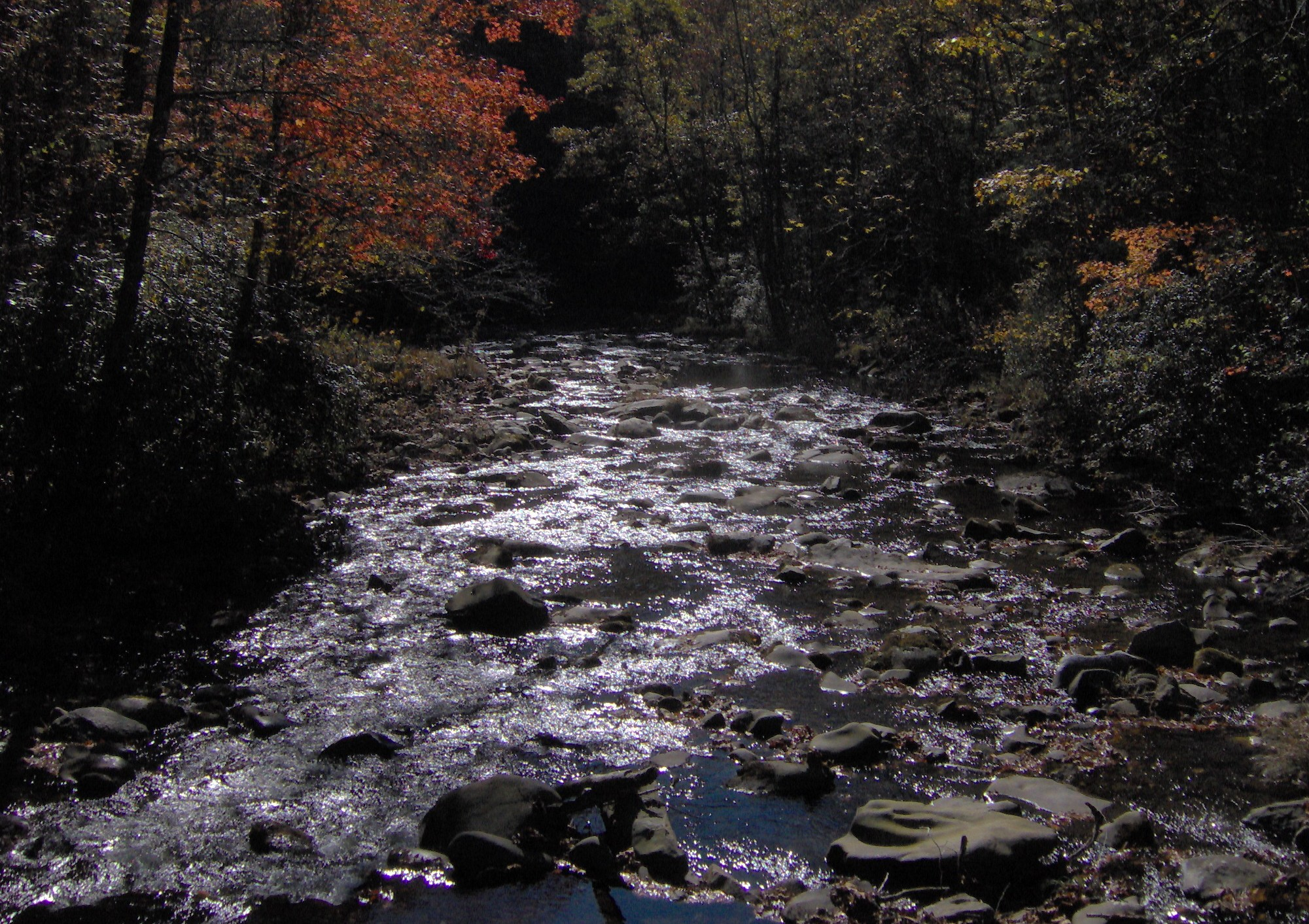

Location
- Country: United States
- State: North Carolina
- Park: Great Smoky Mountains National Park

Physical characteristics
- Source: near Silers Bald
  - location: Swain County, North Carolina
  - coordinates: 35.56329°N 83.56787°W
- Mouth: Fontana Lake
  - location: Proctor, North Carolina
  - coordinates: 35.47079°N 83.72580°W
- Length: 15.8 mi (25.4 km)

Basin features
- River system: Mississippi Basin
- Population: 0

Hazel Creek is a tributary stream of the Little Tennessee River in the southwestern Great Smoky Mountains of North Carolina. The creek's bottomlands were home to several pioneer Appalachian communities and logging towns before their incorporation into the Great Smoky Mountains National Park. Hazel Creek is now a backcountry campsite and historical area.

== Geography ==
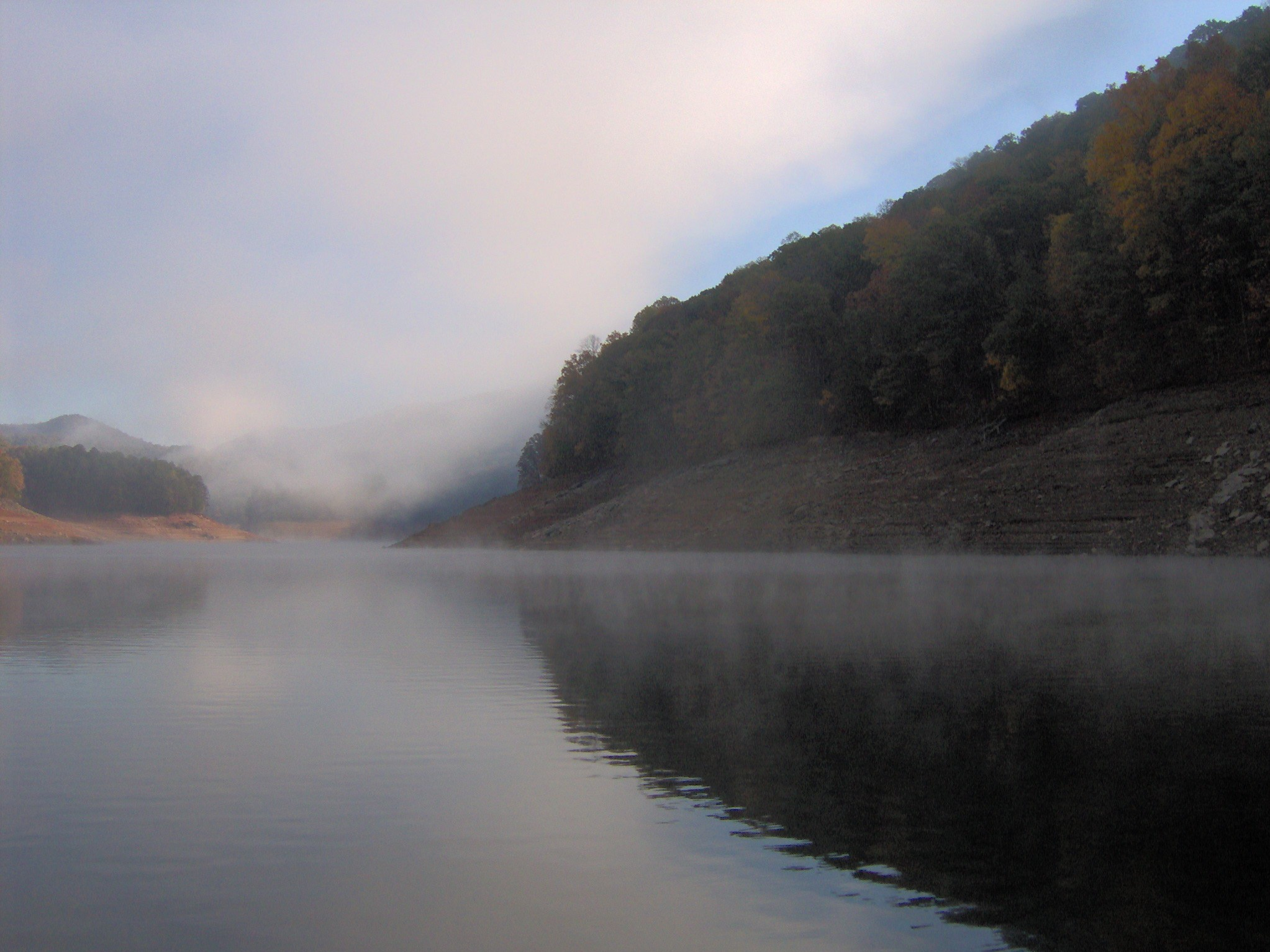
The Hazel Creek embayment along Fontana Lake, near Cable Branch

Hazel Creek flows southwest from its source near the summit of Silers Bald to its mouth along the Fontana impoundment of the Little Tennessee River, a journey of roughly 18 miles (29 km). The creek drains the area between Welch Ridge to the east and Jenkins Trail Ridge to the west. Both Welch and Jenkins, which run perpendicular to the crest of the Smokies, reach elevations of over 5,000 feet (1,500 m) for considerable stretches. Two smaller ridges—the Pinnacle and Locust Ridge—parallel Hazel's northern banks, dividing the creek's valley from its upper watershed. Hazel Creek is one of three major watersheds in the southwestern Smokies, the others being Eagle Creek (on the other side of Jenkins Trail Ridge to the west) and Forney Creek (on the other side of Welch Ridge to the east). These three watersheds comprise the remote, roadless northern banks of Fontana Lake, known locally as the North Shore.

From its source near the Silers Bald Shelter, Hazel Creek drops 1,500 feet (460 m) in just under 1 mile (2 km) before steadying at its confluence with Proctor Creek. 5 miles (8 km) from its source, the creek absorbs Walker's Creek and five smaller streams as it winds its way between two steep knobs known as High Rocks (to the south) and Raven Den (to the north). At the southwestern base of Locust Ridge, the creek absorbs Bone Valley Creek and Sugar Fork before turning sharply to the south and winding its way around the southern base of the Pinnacle. Just before reaching Proctor, the creek turns north and south again at a bend known as "the Horseshoe." At Proctor, Hazel Creek absorbs Shehan Branch before emptying into its Fontana Lake embayment. Northwest of Proctor, Shehan Branch slices a narrow valley known as Possum Hollow.

There are no public roads leading into the Hazel Creek valley. Fontana Village, which provides ferry access to the Hazel Creek Trail, is approximately 5 miles (8.0 km) west of the mouth of Hazel Creek on the other side of Fontana Lake. Along North Carolina State Route 28, Bryson City is just over 30 miles (48 km) east of Fontana. Along U.S. Route 129, Maryville, Tennessee is just over 45 miles (72 km) northwest of Fontana. Fontana is 11 miles (18 km) east of the state line at Deals Gap. Hazel Creek is located entirely within Swain County, North Carolina.

=== Hazel Creek communities ===
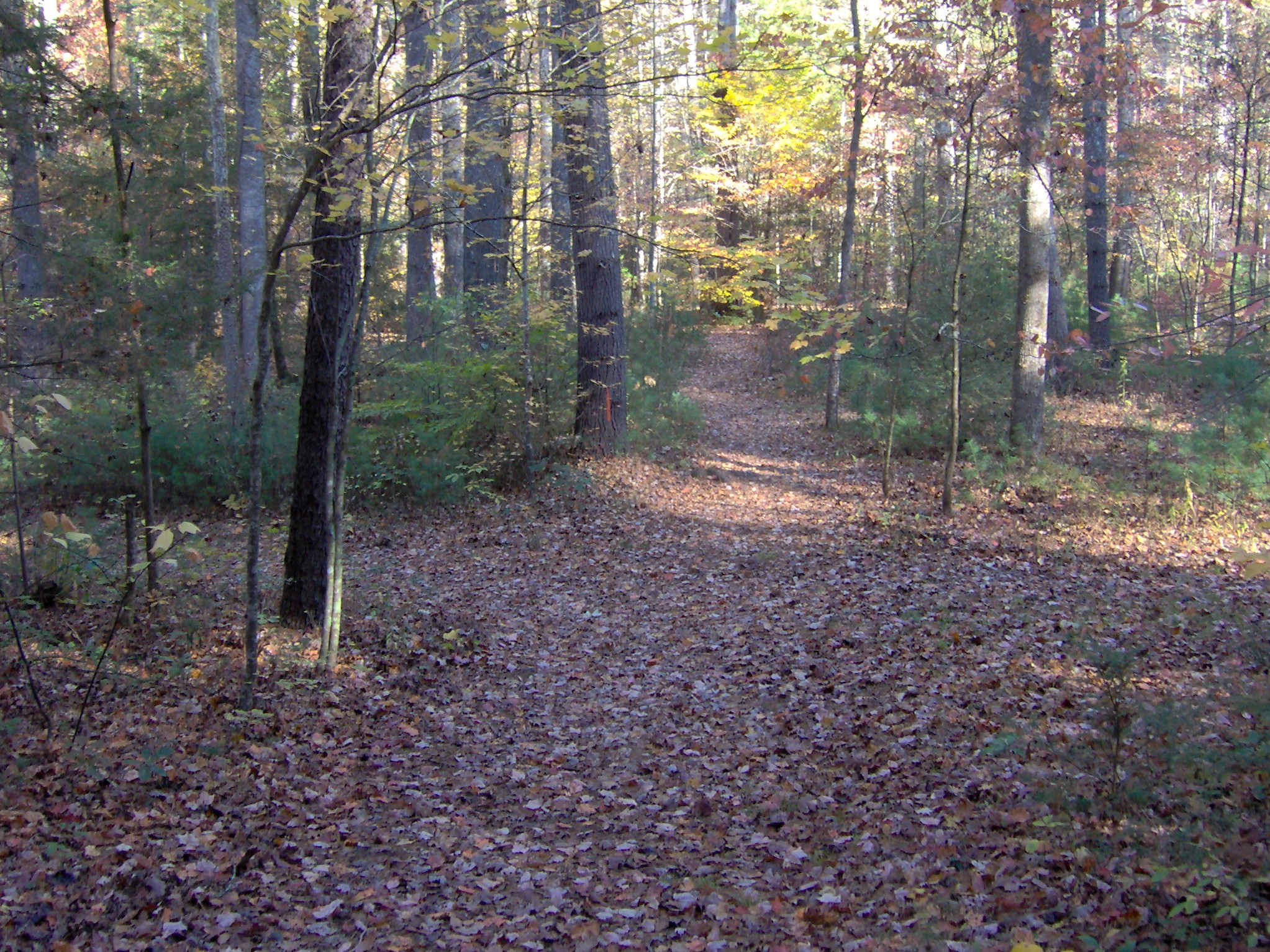
Backcountry Campsite 86 was once part of the town of Proctor

Between 1830 and 1944, several small towns and townships developed along the banks of Hazel Creek. The most prominent of these included:

Proctor — located at the confluence of Shehan Branch and Hazel Creek, between what is now Campsite 86 and the ruins of the Ritter Mill. Named after Hazel Creek's first settlers, Moses and Patience Proctor.

Cable Branch — located downstream from Proctor at the confluence of Hazel Creek and Cable Branch (now part of Hazel's embayment along Fontana). Cable Branch was named after Samuel Cable, who settled along the stream around 1835. The Fontana Marina's low-water Hazel Creek ferry rendezvous is located near the mouth of Cable Branch.

Medlin — located at the confluence of Hazel Creek and Sugar Fork, centered around what is now Campsite 84. Named after Marion Medlin, who settled in the vicinity in the 1860s.

Bone Valley — located at the confluence of Bone Valley Creek and Hazel Creek, in the vicinity of what is now Campsite 83. Named after the many bones left over from a cattle herd that froze to death in the valley, probably around 1888.

Ritter — located at the original confluence of Hazel Creek and the Little Tennessee River, now submerged under Fontana Lake. Named after the Ritter Lumber Company, which used the town as a railroad hub in the early 1900s.

Other important North Shore communities included Bushnell at the confluence of the Tuckasegee River and Little Tennessee River, Wayside at the mouth of Calhoun Creek, and Fontana at the mouth of Eagle Creek.

== History ==
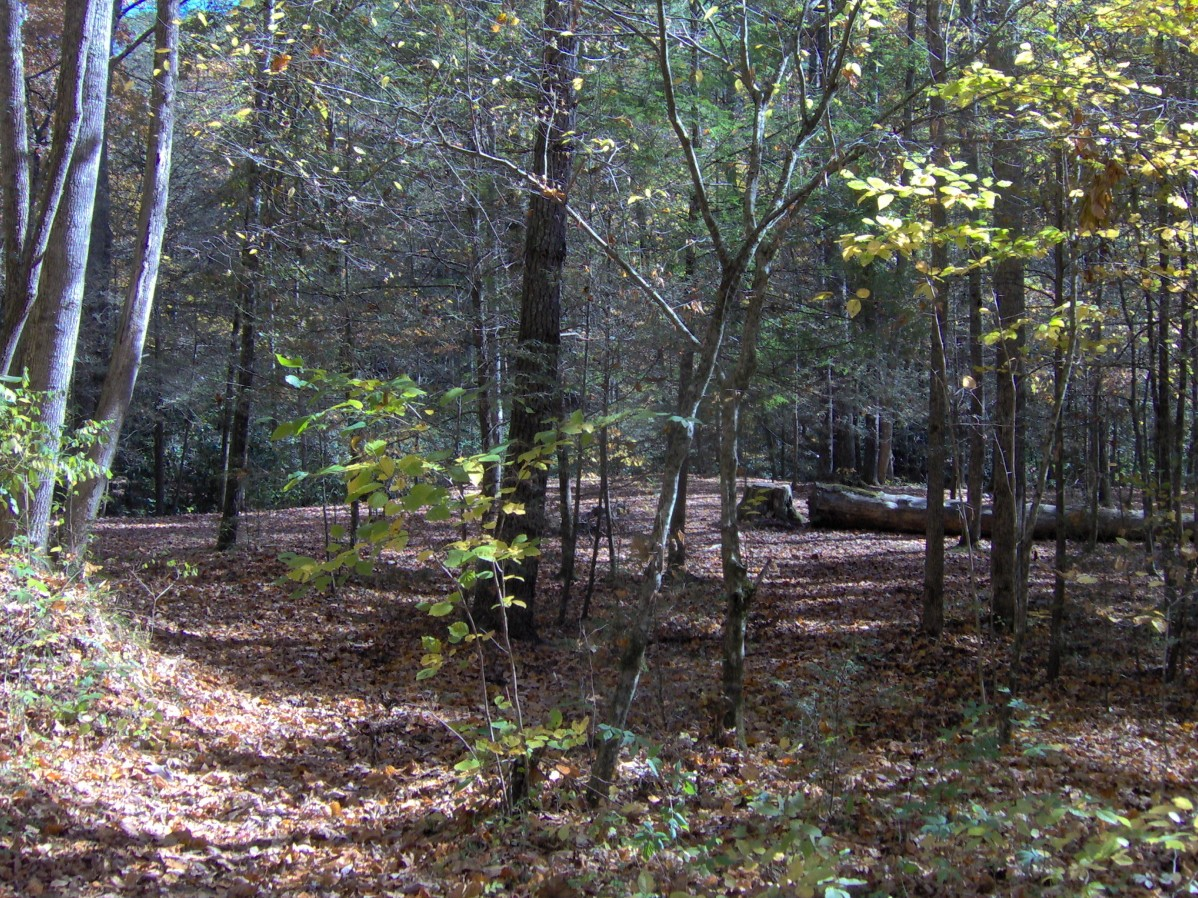
Campsite 84 at the confluence of Sugar Fork and Hazel Creek, once the site of a Cherokee hunting camp and later the town of Medlin

The Cherokee were the first known permanent inhabitants of the Hazel Creek valley, although the valley was much more sparsely populated than the Overhill settlements further down the Little Tennessee valley. A small Cherokee village is known to have existed at the confluence of Sugar Fork and Hazel Creek, and at the time of the arrival of the first settlers, there were Cherokee families living in Possum Hollow. According to local lore, an unmarked Cherokee grave is located near Proctor.

A well-worn Cherokee trail connected Hazel Creek to Cades Cove on the Tennessee side of the Smokies. The trail followed Shehan Branch, crossed the Pinnacle, and ascended Eagle Creek to Ekaneetlee Gap, a col just east of Gregory Bald at the crest, and descended into the cove. From Cades Cove, the trail proceeded to Tuckaleechee Cove and the Overhill settlements. Other less-used trails connected Hazel to Forney Creek on the other side of Welch Ridge to the east and the Tuckasegee River area around modern-day Bryson City.

=== Early settlement, 1829-1860 ===
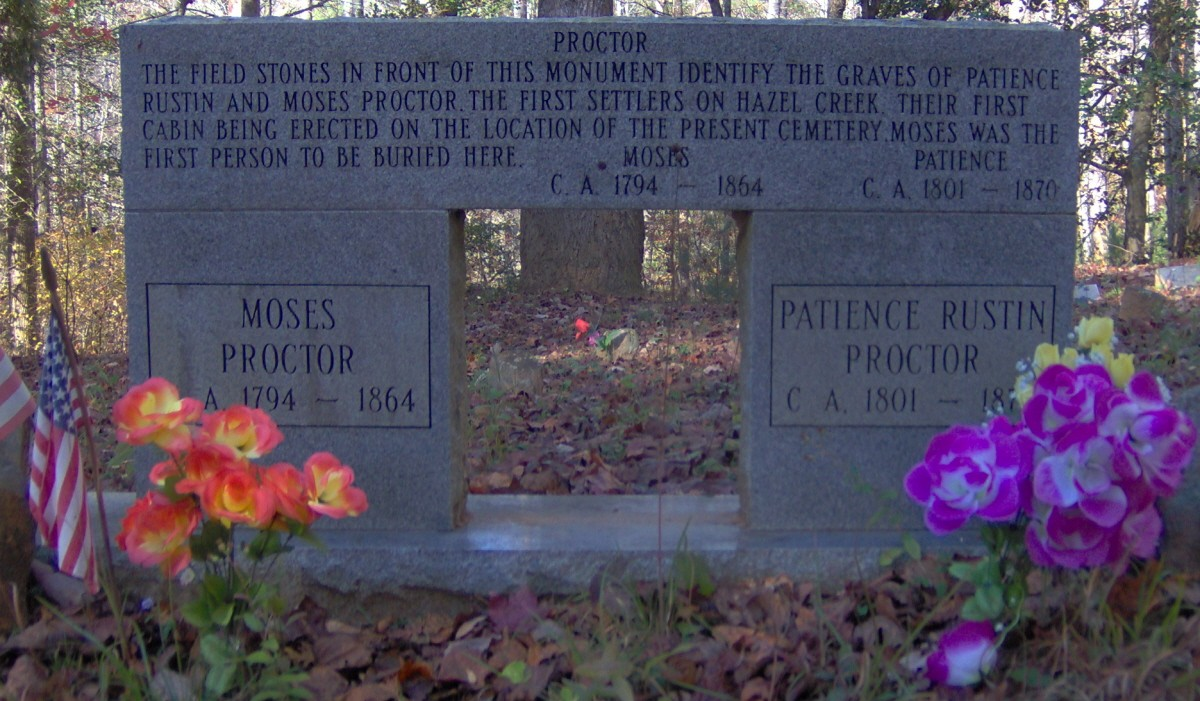
The graves of Moses and Patience Proctor at Proctor Cemetery. The cemetery was the site of Proctor's first cabin.

Moses Proctor (1794–1864) and his wife, Patience Rustin Proctor, were the first known permanent settlers in the Hazel Creek area. The Proctors, who had briefly settled in Cades Cove, crossed the crest at Ekaneetlee Gap in 1829 and built a cabin on a hill in Possum Hollow. The cabin was located at what is now Proctor Cemetery. The Proctors were always on good terms with the Cherokee, who lived further up the hollow.

In 1835, Samuel Cable (c. 1795–1887) and his wife, Elizabeth, settled just downstream from the Proctors at the mouth of Cable Branch (named after them). This area is now part of the Hazel Creek embayment. Samuel's brother, Peter, was a prominent figure in the early history of Cades Cove, and his nephew, John P. Cable, built the large gristmill that still stands near the Cades Cove Visitor Center. Both Cable and Proctor probably wanted to take advantage of an old cattle road that ran from the North Shore area to the Parsons Turnpike. The Turnpike connected Deal's Gap and Chilhowee, thus giving access to markets in Blount County and Knoxville.

Hazel Creek remained sparsely populated until the American Civil War. Joseph Welch, who married the Proctors' daughter Catherine, settled on a small farm near his in-laws. In the 1850s, Josiah and Sarah Bradshaw established a small farm in the Proctor area. Shortly after arriving, the Bradshaws built Hazel Creek's first gristmill. The creek was given its name around this time, probably referring to the hazelnut bushes that lined its banks.

=== The Civil War, 1861-1865 ===
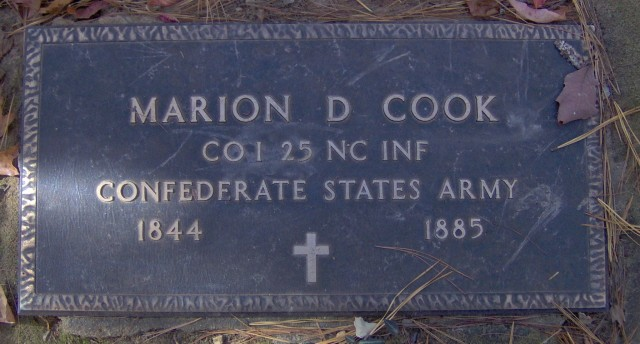
Confederate grave at Bone Valley Cemetery

Although only a handful of families had settled on Hazel Creek by the 1860s, the Civil War still had a major impact on the valley's history. Like most of the North Carolina side of the Smokies, the small population of Hazel Creek supported the Confederacy. This put them at odds with their cousins on the Tennessee side of the mountains in Cades Cove, who were staunchly pro-Union. Union supporters fleeing Confederate North Carolina often fled to Cades Cove via Hazel Creek and Ekaneetlee Gap. Bushwhackers and vigilantes in Cades Cove and Hazel Creek launched raids against one another, usually to steal livestock and crops.

Two sons of Moses and Patience Proctor were killed fighting for the Confederate cause. A third son survived the war but barely made it home. The community of Bone Valley was largely settled by Confederate veterans, 6 of whom are buried in Bone Valley Cemetery, above Campsite 83.

=== Mining and early logging, 1889–1901 ===
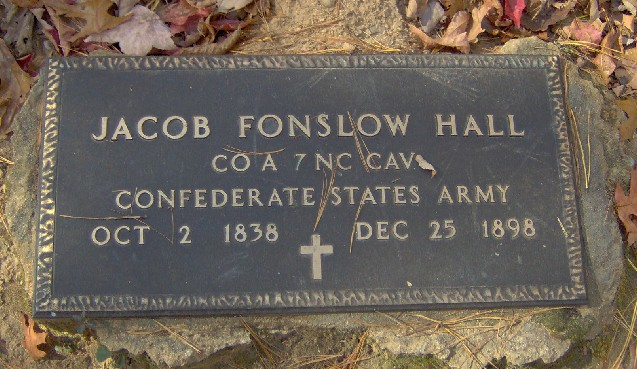
The grave of Jacob Fonslow Hall at Bone Valley Cemetery

After the war, Hazel Creek drew a minor influx of settlers. Hezekiah and Polly Jones settled just downstream from Proctor, where their son would later establish a general store. Jesse Craten "Crate" Hall settled at the mouth of Bone Valley Creek in 1877, where he built a cabin. In 1892, Hall built a second cabin for his growing family, which still stands at the end of the Bone Valley Trail. The family of Reverend Joshua Calhoun arrived in 1886 and established themselves just up the creek from Bone Valley. Marion Medlin settled at the confluence of Sugar Fork and Hazel Creek in 1880. In 1887, Medlin established a post office in his store, thus giving his name to the settlement there.

In 1883, Jacob Fonslow Hall was visiting his brother Jesse when he discovered a copper vein on Little Fork Ridge, a few miles above the mouth of Sugar Fork. The Halls passed on the vein's location to Mark Bryson, a local prospector, who in turn notified New York entrepreneur W. S. Adams. In 1889, after inspecting the vein for himself, Adams immediately set up a mining camp on Little Fork, widened the trail from Sugar Fork to the mouth of Hazel Creek into a wagon road, and made plans to bring in a smelter. However, in 1901 a New Orleans land speculator named George Westfeldt sued Adams, claiming he actually owned the land on which the mine was located. The legal quandary shut down the mine. After a 27-year legal battle, Adams was declared the rightful owner of the mine, although both he and Westfeldt were dead by the time the decision was handed down.

In 1892, a logging firm known as Taylor and Crate (some sources claim it was Johnson and Harris) sent its agent Jack Coburn to buy up timber rights along Hazel Creek. Lacking a railroad, Taylor and Crate used a series of splash dams to move logs in controlled floods downstream to the Little Tennessee, where they would then be floated to the Tennessee River and eventually to a sawmill in Chattanooga. Taylor and Crate never managed to turn a profit, however, and left the valley in 1898.

=== Horace Kephart, 1904–1907 ===
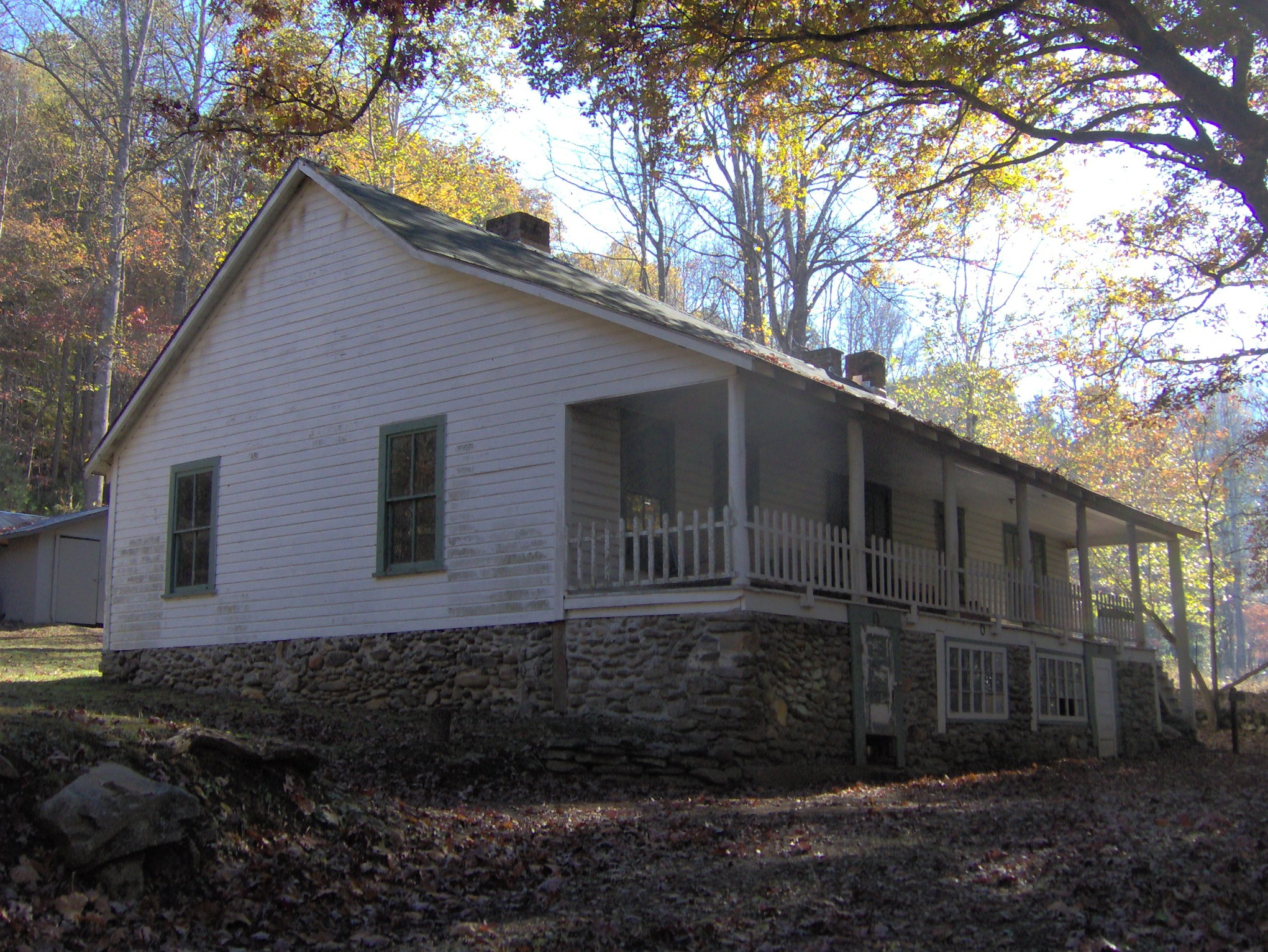
Granville Calhoun's house at Proctor. Calhoun was Kephart's guide on Hazel Creek, and was part of the bear hunt Kephart documented in Our Southern Highlanders.

In 1904, Horace Kephart, a librarian from St. Louis, arrived in Hazel Creek with plans to study the wilderness areas of the Southern Appalachian highlands. Kephart moved into a cabin at the old Adams mining camp just above Sugar Fork, about two miles (3 km) from Medlin. Kephart gave the following description of Medlin:

Medlin itself comprised two little stores built of rough planks and bearing no signs, a corn mill, and four dwellings. 1.5 miles (2 km) away was the log schoolhouse, which, once or twice a month, served also as a church. Scattered about the settlement were seven tiny tub mills for grinding corn..."

Kephart's book Our Southern Highlanders (published in 1913) was the first widely read study of Southern Appalachian culture. The fourth chapter of the book, "A Bear Hunt In the Smokies," recounts a typical bear-hunting excursion to the crest of the Smokies. Three members of the hunting party— Granville Calhoun, "Little John" Cable, and "Doc" Jones— were children of early Hazel Creek pioneers. The hunting party stayed at a herding shack built by Jesse "Crate" Hall along the crest near Chestnut Bald. Kephart was fascinated by the crest of the Western Smokies, which in the early 1900s was a giant grassy bald.

Although Our Southern Highlanders gives invaluable descriptions of several aspects of life in the Smokies in the early 1900s, the book has been criticized for focusing too much on the more sensational facets of mountain life, such as moonshining and those families living in extreme poverty. And while Kephart claimed he received positive feedback from the mountain people, former Hazel Creek resident Duane Oliver recalled that the book angered many of the creek's residents for the stereotypical way in which it portrayed them.

=== The Ritter Lumber Company, 1907–1927 ===
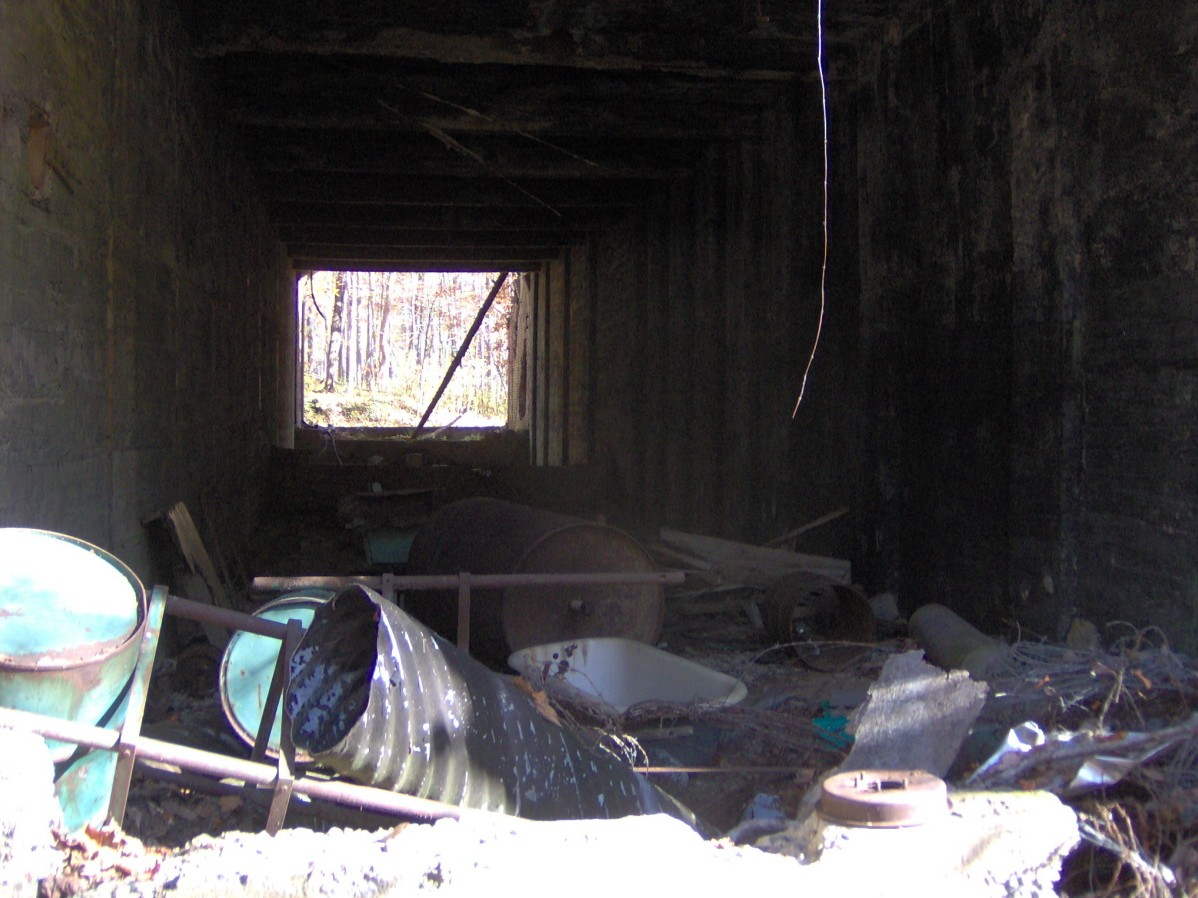
Ruins at the Ritter Mill site, just east of Proctor

In 1902, the W. M. Ritter Lumber Company began making plans for a massive lumbering operation along Hazel Creek. Ritter convinced Southern Railway to extend the railroad from Bushnell to the mouth of Hazel Creek, where Ritter built the hub that bore his name. From this hub, Ritter constructed a logging railroad extending 16 miles (26 km) up the Hazel Creek valley to the mouth of Proctor Creek. The train, operated by Ritter's subsidiary Smoky Mountain Railway, offered passenger service to Proctor and Medlin.

With railroad access, Ritter managed to construct a large sawmill just east of Proctor. Proctor itself nearly doubled in size, with a population of over 1,000 by 1920. The Proctor mill included a planing mill for making furniture and drying kilns for flooring. The company started on the south side of the creek and worked its way up to the Hazel Cascades, just below the creek's source. The company's highest camp was at Buckeye Gap on the crest of the Smokies, near the source of Proctor Creek (traces of this camp remain along the Appalachian Trail). After cutting the ridges and coves along Hazel's south banks, Ritter turned around and proceeded back down along the creek's north bank, stripping bare cove after cove along the way.

By 1928, when Ritter ceased operations, the company had cut 201,000,000 board feet (470,000 m^{3}) of lumber in the Hazel Creek watershed. Although Ritter brought jobs and cash to the inhabitants of Hazel Creek, the company's destructive logging practices led to long-term environmental damage to the forest and creek itself.

=== Grace Lumpkin, early 1920s ===
Socialist writer Grace Lumpkin (1892–1980) lived at Hazel Creek for a brief time in the early 1920s. The Hazel Creek community would become the inspiration for the fictitious community of Swain's Crossing in Lumpkin's 1932 novel, To Make My Bread. Although fictional, Swain's Crossing includes a place called "Possum Hollow," a "Siler's Cove" (obviously influenced by Silers Bald), and a large mountain known as "Thunderhead" (Thunderhead Mountain crowns the crest of the Smokies between Hazel Creek and Cades Cove). Lumpkin also rehashes the story of an entire herd of cattle freezing to death, similar to the legend behind the naming of Bone Valley.

Grace Lumpkin, Horace Kephart, and Hazel Creek in the mid-1920s are featured in Walt Larimore's 2012 novels Hazel Creek and Sugar Fork.

=== The national park and Fontana Dam, 1927–present ===
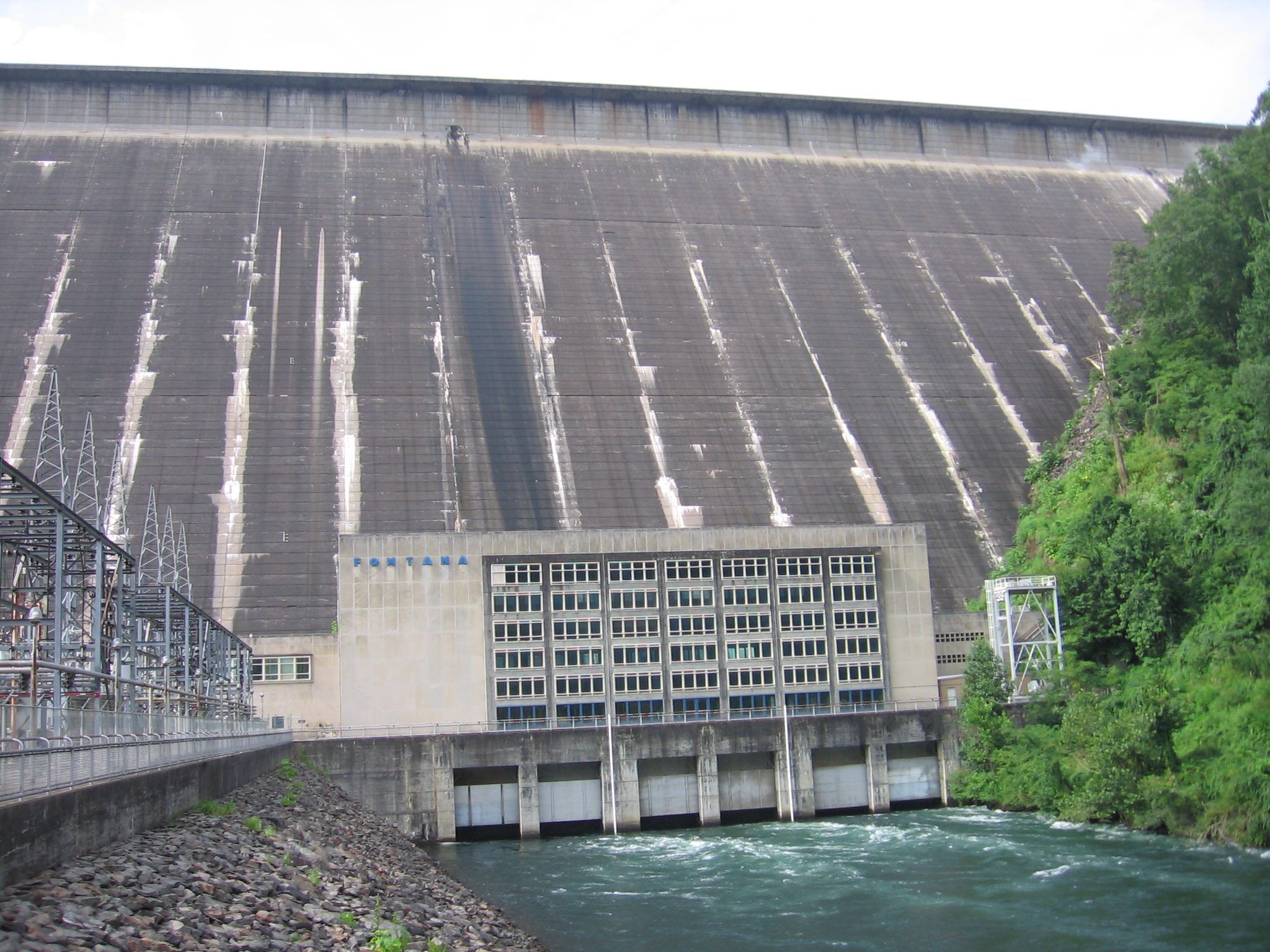
Fontana Dam

In the early 1900s, entrepreneur R. E. Woods decided to establish a railroad hub at the mouth of Eagle Creek for his Montvale Lumber Company, which was logging the upper reaches of Eagle Creek. Woods' sister-in-law suggested the name Fontana, which is the Italian word for fountain.

In the 1930s, the Aluminum Company of America, which operated a large plant north of Maryville, bought up 15,000 acres (61 km^{2}) above the town of Fontana as part of a plan to build a large dam to provide power to its plants. The operation moved along slowly until the outbreak of World War II, when the demand for aluminum skyrocketed. ALCOA turned its 15,000 acres (61 km^{2}) over to the Tennessee Valley Authority, which quickly completed the dam in 1944. That year, the TVA bought out the remaining North Shore settlements, including those along Hazel Creek. As most of the land along the creek had little financial value, TVA could only offer prices that most of Hazel's residents found absurdly low. Those that refused to sell, however, were forced out via condemnation suits. The last families left Hazel Creek in November 1944, before the rising lake waters inundated the only major road out. The land was turned over to the recently created Great Smoky Mountains National Park shortly thereafter, effectively extending the park boundary to the shores of Fontana Lake. The Civilian Conservation Corps, which had been operating a camp at Proctor since the late 1930s, repaired bridges, tore down buildings, and improved trails along the creek's watershed.

=== The North Shore Road ===
With the inundation of the only highway along the northern banks of Fontana Lake, the Hazel Creek, Forney Creek, and Eagle Creek valleys were suddenly isolated. Prior to the creation of the dam, those who owned land that was taken by the TVA were promised that there would be a road built to access above-water cemeteries and homesites, as well as to stimulate economic development in the region. These promises resulted in a 1943 agreement, which was signed by the TVA, Department of Interior, Swain County, and the State of North Carolina, which stipulated that the road be constructed "if and when monies are appropriated." This new road would be built along the North Shore, connecting Bryson City with US-129 just beyond Fontana Dam. Between 1948 and 1970, the Department of the Interior (via the National Park Service) built 7.2 miles (11.6 km) of this road just outside Bryson City. Due primarily to staunch opposition from environmental groups, however, the project stalled. The unfinished 7.2-mile (11.6 km) stretch was nicknamed "the Road to Nowhere" by locals.

In 2000, Congress (largely at the behest of North Carolina Senator Jesse Helms and North Carolina Congressman Charles H. Taylor) appropriated 16 million dollars for the completion of the North Shore Road. In an Environmental Impact Statement released in 2007, however, the Park Service concluded that the proposed road would be in violation of the Great Smoky Mountains National Park's General Management Plan and recommended one of the proposed alternatives, a $52 million settlement to Swain County. Swain County commissioners voted to accept the settlement on February 5, 2010, accepting a new agreement that terminated the 1943 agreement. The Department of Interior transferred the remaining funds, $12.8 million, from the 2000 appropriation to an account managed by the North Carolina Treasury Department, which pays out interest payments to Swain County on an annual basis. The remainder of the $52 million, $38.2 million, has yet to be paid by the Department of Interior to Swain County, despite $4 million being included on a prioritized project list for the National Park Service in the 2012 Consolidated Appropriations Act.

After several years of meeting with Department of Interior officials, Swain County commissioners agreed in 2016 to bring a lawsuit against the department for failure to pay the additional funds. The 2010 agreement contains a stipulation that will terminate the agreement automatically on December 31, 2020, regardless of how much of the $52 million has been paid.

== Hazel Creek today ==
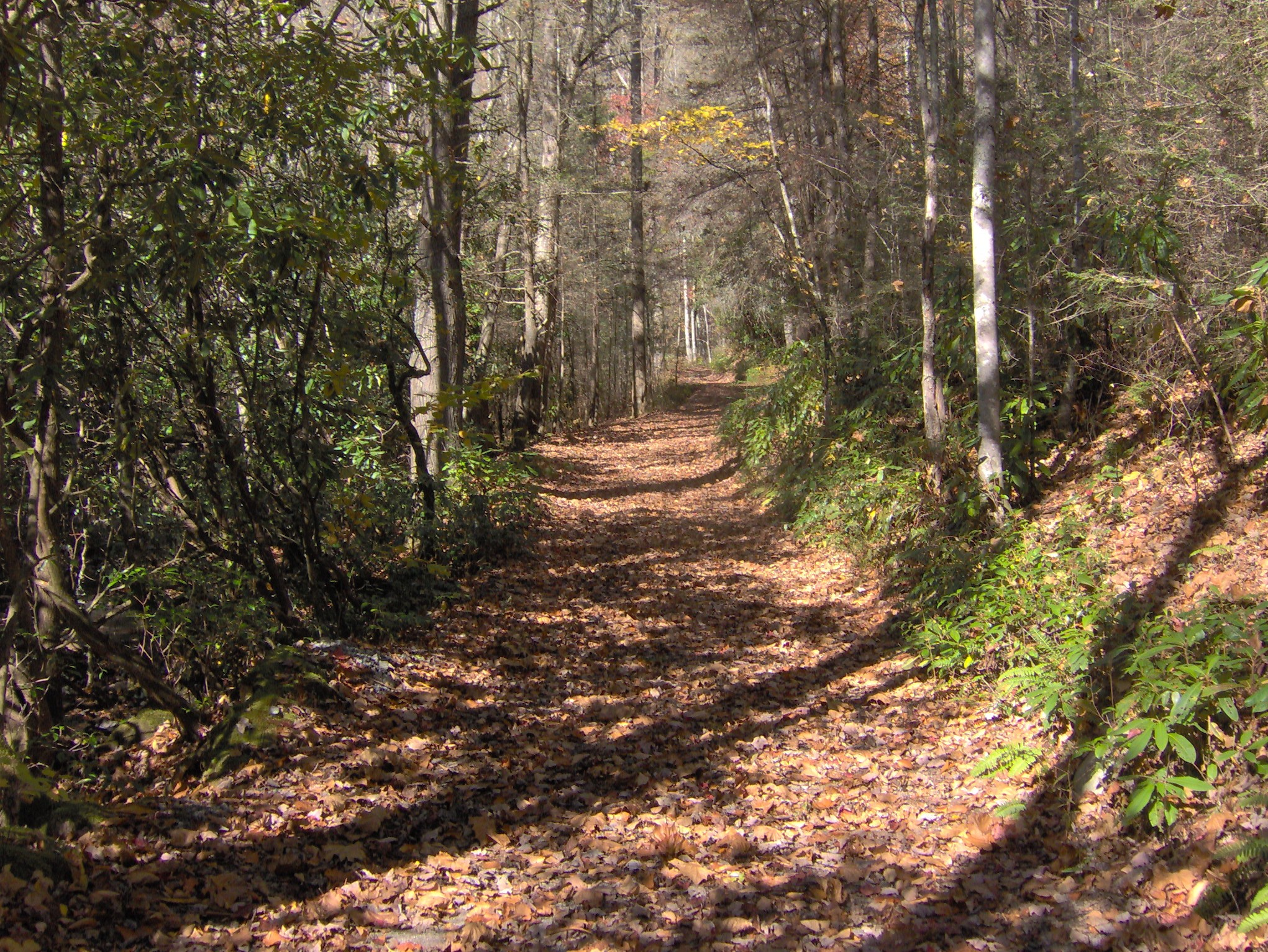
The Bone Valley Trail is one of the most remote trails in the park

The Hazel Creek area remains one of the most remote regions of the Great Smoky Mountains National Park, due largely to the fact that the North Shore Road was never completed. The Fontana Village Marina provides ferry access (via pontoon boat) to both Eagle Creek and Hazel Creek. As of 2009, the ferry ride to Hazel Creek costs $50 per person and takes about 20 minutes.

Hazel Creek can also be accessed via a 10-mile (16 km) hike from Fontana Dam or a 16-mile (26 km) hike from Cades Cove. Five backcountry campsites are located along Hazel Creek between the creek's confluence with Shehan Branch and its confluence with Walker's Creek. Backcountry Campsite 86 is located at what was once Proctor. Campsite 84 was once the town of Medlin and, before that, a small Cherokee settlement. Campsite 83 was once the Bone Valley settlement.

=== Historical sites in the Hazel Creek area ===
- Calhoun House, built by George Higdon and purchased by Granville Calhoun in 1928. After 1944, park rangers used the Calhoun House as a bunkhouse, giving it the name "Hazel Creek Hilton." The house is located at the Hazel Creek trailhead, near Campsite 86.

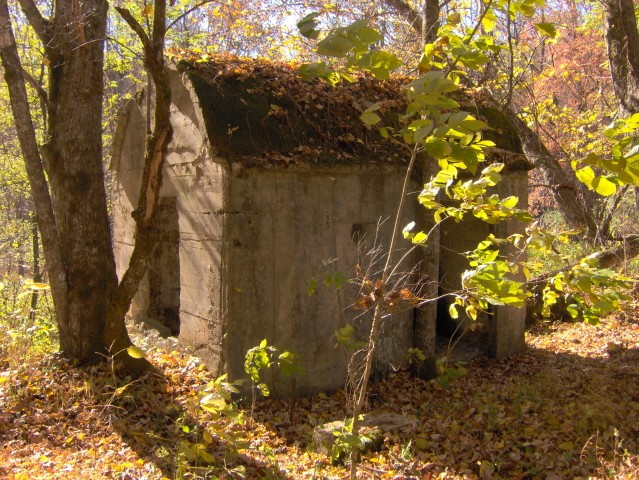
Drying kiln at the Ritter Mill site

- Hall Cabin, built in 1892 by Jesse "Crate" Hall and his wife, Tabitha Dills Hall, located at the end of the Bone Valley Trail. This cabin, made of poplar logs, is the most remote historical structure in the Great Smokies, being a 9-mile (14 km) hike from the ferry rendezvous. In the 1920s, the cabin was used by the Kress family as part of a hunting lodge. In 1976, the cabin was placed on the National Register of Historic Places. This "Hall Cabin" should not be confused with the "Hall Cabin" mentioned often by Kephart, which was a herder's shack atop the crest of the Smokies near Chestnut Bald (although both were built by Crate Hall).
- The Ritter Mill Site consists of the ruins of the R.M. Ritter Lumber Company's saw mill, mill pond (now empty), and drying kilns, built around 1910. An unmarked manway leads from the Hazel Creek Trail to the sawmill site, where the walls of the sawmill still stand. The manway continues uphill to the site of "the Clubhouse," which was a lodge used by Ritter executives and dignitaries. The mill is located about 0.5 miles (800 m) east of the Calhoun House.
- The Adams-Westfeldt Mine Site, located along Little Fork of Sugar Fork, about two miles (3 km) above Campsite 84 (Medlin). Author Horace Kephart lived in a cabin at the mining site from 1904 to 1907.
- Proctor Cemetery, located on a hill about 0.5 miles (800 m) east of the Calhoun House in Possum Hollow. The cemetery is also the site of the cabin (no longer standing) of Moses and Patience Proctor, who were the first Euro-American settlers in the area in 1829.
- Bone Valley Cemetery, located on a hill northwest of the junction of the Bone Valley Trail and Hazel Creek Trail. Several members of the Wright, Hall, Laney, and Cook families are buried here. The Bone Valley Baptist Church, built by Joshua Calhoun around 1880, was also located at the trail junction.

== See also ==
- Fontana Dam
- Little Tennessee River
