= Silers Bald =

Mountain in the United States

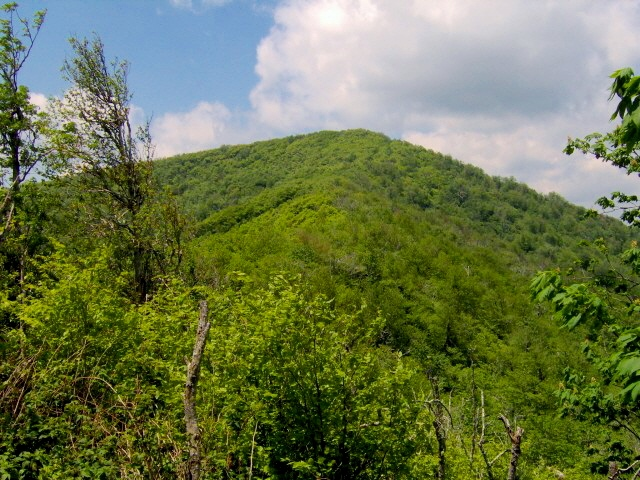
- The summit of Silers Bald, looking west from the Narrows.

Highest point
- Elevation: 5,607 ft (1,709 m)
- Prominence: 337 ft (103 m)
- Coordinates: 35.56583°N 83.56528°W

Geography
- Location: Swain County, North Carolina / Sevier County, Tennessee, U.S.
- Parent range: Great Smoky Mountains
- Topo map: USGS Silers Bald

Climbing
- Easiest route: Appalachian Trail west from Kuwohi

Silers Bald is a mountain in the western Great Smoky Mountains, located in the southeastern United States with the Great Smoky Mountains National Park. Its proximity to Kuwohi and its location along the Appalachian Trail make it a popular hiking destination.

== Description ==
Silers Bald is located on the crest of the Smokies with Thunderhead Mountain to the west and Kuwohi to the east. The Tennessee-North Carolina state line crosses the summit, with the mountain split evenly between Sevier County, Tennessee, to the north and Swain County, North Carolina, to the south. Silers Bald rises approximately 2,500 feet (760 m) above its northern base near Fish Camp Prong (of Little River), and approximately 3,000 feet (910 m) above its southern base near Forney Creek.

While Silers Bald was a grassy bald for most of the 19th and early 20th centuries, it was probably a wooded peak before the arrival of European settlers. For this reason, the National Park Service does not maintain the bald atop the mountain (the park currently maintains only two grassy balds—Gregory Bald and Andrews Bald). A narrow corridor for the Appalachian Trail, which crosses the summit, is kept clear for hikers. There is still a small bald area at the summit, approximately 30 feet (9.1 m) in diameter, where the Appalachian Trail makes a 90-degree turn. Several grassy meadows remain on the mountain's western slope.

== Geology ==
Silers Bald consists of Thunderhead sandstone, a small pile of which crowns the summit. This sandstone, part of the Ocoee Supergroup, was formed from ocean sediments nearly a billion years ago. The mountain, like most of the Smokies, was formed some 200 million years ago when the North American and African plates collided during the Appalachian orogeny, pushing the rock upward.

== History ==
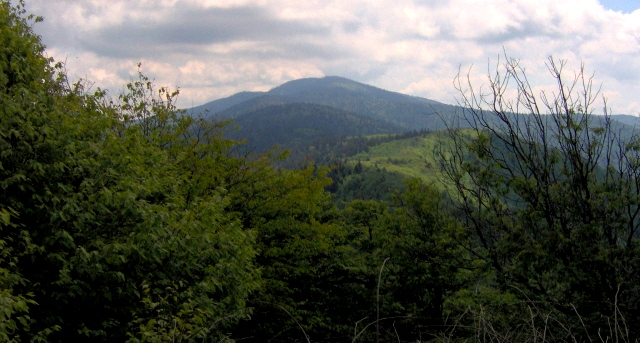
Kuwohi, looking east from the summit of Silers Bald

While Silers Bald is hardly mentioned in Cherokee lore, a petroglyph was discovered near the summit in 1917. The mountain's elevation is probably recorded by Arnold Guyot during his 1859 survey of the Smokies crest but under a different name (possibly Guyot's "Big Stone Mountain," which Guyot listed with an elevation of 5,614 feet (1,711 m) and lying somewhere between Mt. Buckley and Thunderhead).

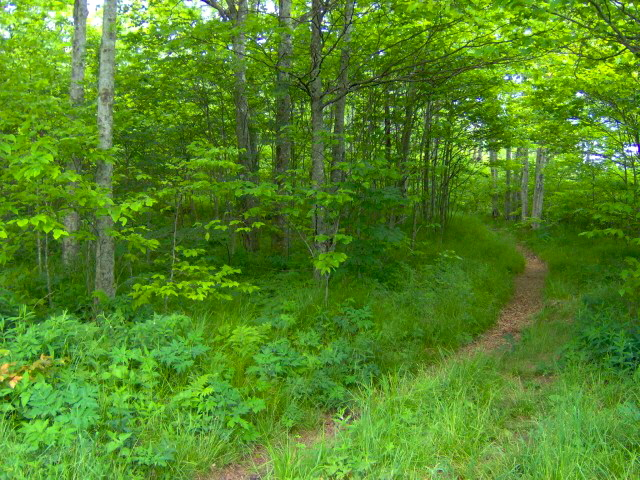
What was once a massive grazing land has reverted to patches of meadow and young woodland on the western slope of Silers Bald

Silers Bald is named after Jesse Siler, a prominent North Carolinian who grazed sheep and cattle atop the mountain in the 19th century. Likewise, Siler Bald, in the Nantahala Mountains to the south, was named after Jesse's brother, William. Albert Mountain, also to the south, was named after Jesse's nephew, Albert Siler.

By the late 19th century, Silers Bald was the far eastern end of a giant grassy pasture that stretched several miles across the Smokies' western ridge all the way to Russell Field, which overlooks Cades Cove. The mountain is mentioned several times in Horace Kephart's Our Southern Highlanders as the last stop before one enters a heavily-wooded wilderness. According to Kephart, beyond "Hall cabin" (a herder's shack near modern Big Chestnut Bald, six miles (10 km) east of Thunderhead):

...there is just one shack, at Siler's Meadow. It is down below the summit, hidden in timber, and you would never have seen it. Even if you had, you would have found it as bare as a last year's mouse nest, for nobody ever goes there except for a few bear-hunters. From there onward for forty miles is an uninhabited wilderness so rough that you could not make seven miles a day in it to save your life..."

Laura Thornborough, a writer who visited Silers Bald in the 1930s, recalls it as a giant meadow:

Silers is one of the mysterious grassy balds, or mountain-top meadows, and an outstanding vantage point commanding spectacular views.

== Access ==
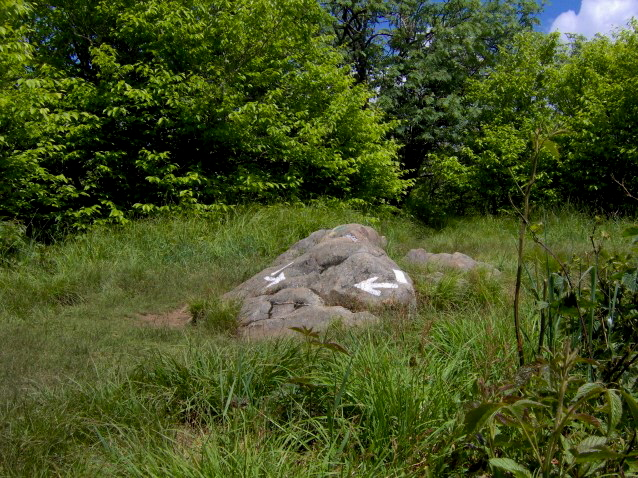
The summit of Silers Bald. The white arrows mark the direction of the Appalachian Trail

The easiest access to Silers Bald is to take the Kuwohi tower trail from the Forney Ridge parking lot to the tower. From there, following the Appalachian Trail west the summit of Silers Bald is just over four miles (6 km). This leg of the trail is riddled with elevation gain and loss, crossing Mt. Buckley (a knob of Kuwohi), Jenkins Knob, and a sparsely-wooded ridge known as "The Narrows".

At the summit of Silers Bald, an unmarked spur trail winds several yards to a cliff on the northwest slope of the mountain. This cliff offers a 180-degree view of the northern Smokies, with a clear view of Mount Le Conte to the east and Thunderhead Mountain to the west.

== See also ==
- List of mountains in North Carolina
