= Judson, Swain County, North Carolina =

Submerged former town

Coordinates: 35.406°N 83.559°W

Judson was a former small town in Swain County, North Carolina which had a population of around 600. It was evacuated for construction of the Fontana Dam on the Little Tennessee River, completed in 1944, which created the Fontana Lake reservoir upriver.

Numerous historic towns and prehistoric sites were inundated by the lake. Some structures are visible when the lake is at its yearly low.

As partial compensation the federal government promised to construct a new road that would allow the displaced residents to still have access to lands around the lake, including cemeteries where many of their relatives were buried. Only seven miles of road were built before being abandoned, this is now known locally as "The Road To Nowhere".

== See also ==
- Proctor, North Carolina, a town isolated by Lake Fontana and abandoned
- Glenville, North Carolina, a town submerged by Lake Glenville
