= Hunter Library =

University library at Western Carolina University

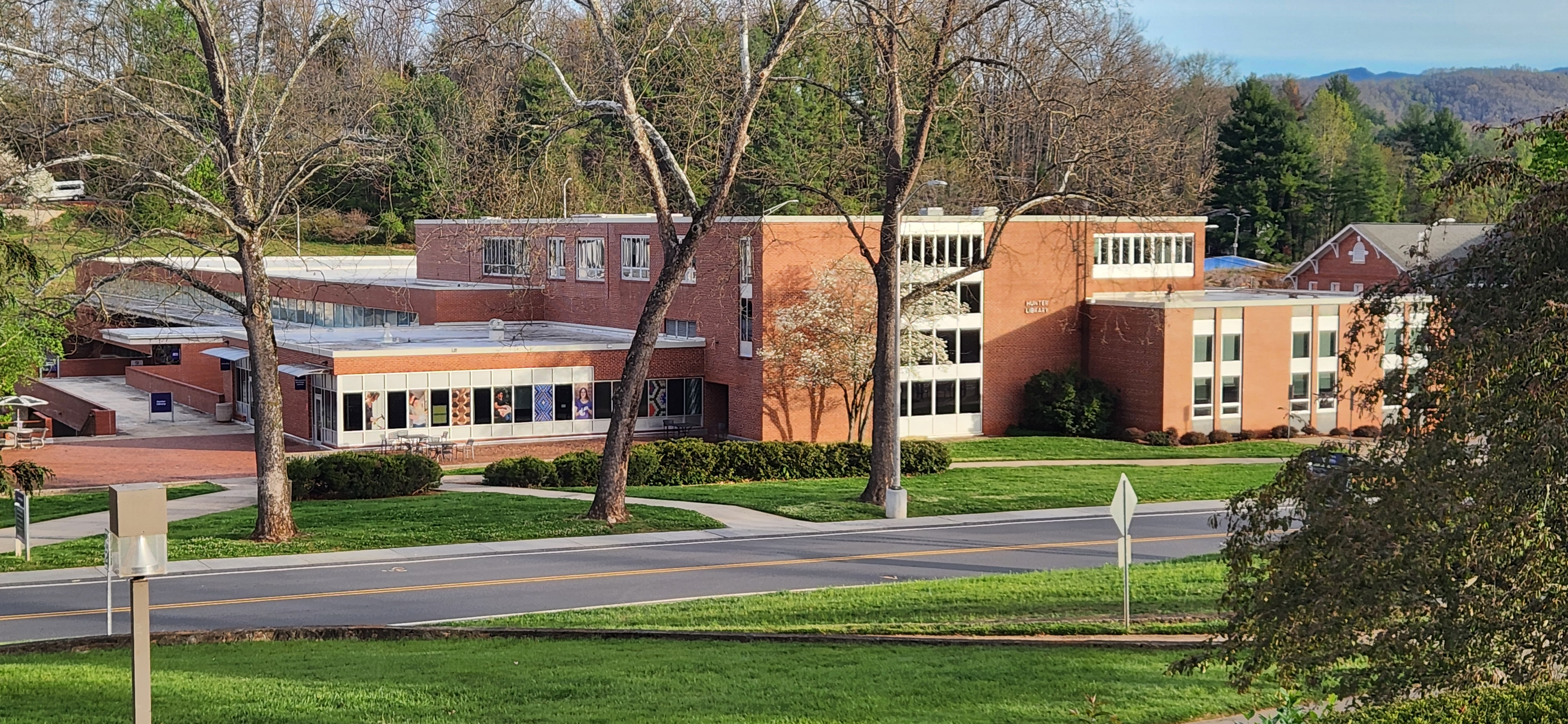
- 35.313339°N 83.179719°W
- Location: Cullowhee, NC, United States of America
- Type: Academic
- Established: 1953

Other information
- Employees: 50
- Website: https://www.wcu.edu/hunter-library/

Hunter Library is the university library at Western Carolina University and is located in Cullowhee, North Carolina. Hunter Library supports Western Carolina University's mission of teaching and learning. The Library provides intellectual content, and services related to its discovery and use, for the learning, teaching, and research activities of the University's students, faculty, and staff. By supporting the acquisition of learning and the production of knowledge and scholarship, Hunter Library intends to inspire the individual and the intellect, fostering professional, personal and social growth.

== History ==
The building is named after Hiram Tyram Hunter, who was President of the University from 1923 to 1947. It was constructed in 1953 on a former football field, and Hunter Library was expanded in 1967 and again in 1983 to accommodate its growing collection. On February 26th, 1989, a fire in the media center damaged the building. The library reopened on April 24th with limited materials.

== Facts and Figures ==
Hunter Library is an accredited institution which serves a student body of over 10,000 students from all over the United States and from Europe, Asia, Africa, and South America. The library collection contains more than 389,052 volumes in print, nearly 92,621 media items, and over 1,215 items on microform. It provides access to 346 online databases and over 183,429 journal titles. The library has a staff of 50 employees which includes 22 tenure-track librarians. In April 2026, Heidi Buchanan became the Dean of Hunter Library.

== Services ==
Besides its regular operating hours, Hunter Library is open 24 hours two weeks prior to the end of the spring and fall semesters; this includes exam week. Its librarians teach classes and assist patrons with their research questions. The library has individual study carrels and group study rooms for students and faculty. An electronic classroom and two film viewing rooms are available for library instruction and workshops. In 1987, Hunter Library created the Hunter Scholar award to encourage faculty scholarship. Hunter Scholar rewards faculty whose research makes extensive use of library collections.

== Noteworthy Collections ==
Of particular note in the Library is Special Collections. This restricted access section of the Library has papers and photographs related to Horace Kephart's life in North Carolina, the history of Western Carolina University and surrounding area, and manuscripts related to the Cherokee Indians, the cultural and natural history of western North Carolina and vicinity, and literary works of native or naturalized North Carolinians who reside in the area. Special Collections also maintains the Cherokee Phoenix project, which translated and digitized selected articles that appeared in the Cherokee newspaper from 1828-1834.

Hunter Library is heavily involved with several grant-based digitization projects. "Craft Revival: Shaping Western North Carolina Past and Present" was funded by a Heritage Partners grant from the North Carolina Library Services and Technology Act. Its purpose was to create a web-based digital history of the historic effort to revive handcraft in the western part of the state. Other noteworthy collections include "The Great Smoky Mountains: A Park for America," "Stories of Mountain Folk," "Picturing Appalachia," and "Horace Kephart: Revealing an Enigma." Hunter Library is also part of the Southern Appalachian Digital Collections in partnership with UNC Asheville and has contributed to Digital NC. Hunter Library is also a part of the Western North Carolina Library Network (WNCLN) with Appalachian State University and the University of North Carolina at Asheville. The three libraries share an online catalog and operate a materials delivery service between the member campuses.

The Curriculum Materials Center, located in the upper mezzanine floor of Hunter Library supports teacher education students for their field experiences, children's and adolescent literature, and teaching methodology coursework.

== Layout ==
Hunter Library has three floors and two mezzanines. The main floor includes reference books, current and bound periodicals, government documents, microforms, maps, leisure reading, and audio/visual materials. The Library's primary service points, circulation and reference, are also located on the main floor. In addition, the main floor includes a makerspace, classrooms, and a virtual reality/gaming room. The ground floor is where the general stacks of monographs reside, as well as some older reference items. The perimeter of the ground floor has group study rooms and a multisensory room available on a first-come, first-served basis, and lockable study rooms available on a limited basis to faculty only. The Technology Commons also occupies part of the ground floor of Hunter Library. The top floor houses Hunter Library's Special Collections as well as the administrative offices of the Library. The two mezzanines are occupied by the Curriculum Materials Center (CMC Mezzanine), which houses teaching materials and children's books, and Lower Level Mezzanine, which houses older bound periodicals and a limited number of private study rooms that are available to graduate students. The building itself is also home to a Java City coffee shop, the Coulter Faculty Commons, and the Mountain Heritage Center.
