= Shuckstack =

Mountain in North Carolina, United States

Coordinates: 35.48556°N 83.815°W

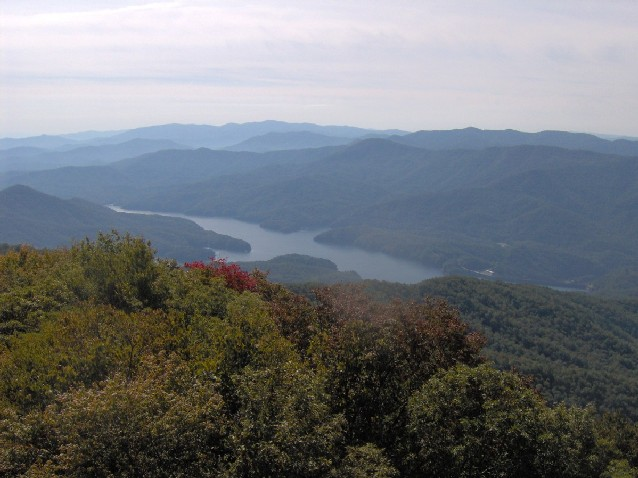
Fontana Lake and the Nantahala Mountains, looking southeast from the Shuckstack fire tower

Shuckstack is a mountain in the Great Smoky Mountains of Swain County, North Carolina, in the southeastern United States. It has an elevation of 4,020 feet (1,230 m) above sea level and rises approximately 2,300 feet (700 m) above Fontana Lake to the south.

A historic fire tower stands at the summit of Shuckstack, offering a panoramic view of the western Smokies, Yellow Creek, Unicoi Mountains, Cheoah, and the Nantahala National Forest. Although no longer in use, the fire tower is accessible to the public. The summit of Shuckstack is accessed via the Appalachian Trail and a short spur trail. The spur trail is marked by a T-shaped white blaze and is approximately 3.5 miles (5.6 km) from the parking lot on the north side of Fontana Dam. It is considered a strenuous hike with rapid elevation gain—approximately 2,300 feet (700 m).

Along with the fire tower, the summit of Shuckstack also hosts the chimney, foundation, and cistern of what was once a fire watchman's cabin along with several outcroppings of Precambrian Ocoee Supergroup sandstone.
