= Proctor, North Carolina =

Former town in Swain County, North Carolina

Coordinates: 35°28′24″N 83°43′35″W

Proctor is a former town located in Swain County, North Carolina, U.S.A. It was on Hazel Creek. It is named after Moses Proctor, the first European-American settler to this area. The town was flooded by Fontana Lake, which was created by the construction of the Fontana Dam in 1944 during World War II. It remains submerged unless lake levels are very low.

While the Proctor mine offices were flooded, much of the town and cemetery are above the water line. There is one home left and remains of the lumber mill.

Former residents were promised a road along the north side of the lake, but only seven miles were built because of various issues: the former town became part of Great Smoky Mountains National Park, the National Park Service opposed the road, and funding was short for this after the war. The NPS did provide ferry boats to allow visits to the former town cemeteries, which are accessible only by trails.

The town of Proctor is mentioned in an episode of ASY TV’s It Happened to Me, in which hiker John Vineyard recalls an ill-fated trek through the town that featured bear encounters, rattlesnakes and paranormal activity.

Proctor, North Carolina was the location of a September 2024 paranormal investigation with the show Wrestling With Ghosts. The cast allegedly had another encounter with something purporting itself to be Spearfinger. What makes this episode exponentially more interesting is that the crew unwittingly left the area a mere 12 hours before Hurricane Helene ravaged Proctor and caused water levels of Fontana Lake to raise over 22 feet.

== See also ==
- Judson, another town submerged by Fontana Lake.
