= Camping and Woodcraft =

1916 book published by Horace Kephart

Camping and Woodcraft is an American classic published by Horace Kephart in 1916, detailing the practical skill-sets needed to endure the harsh conditions of the wilderness, and to make that experience more enjoyable to the amateur outdoorsman. The work is a revised and expanded edition of Kephart's 1906 Camping and Woodcraft, a pocket-manual published by the author with the expressed purpose of rendering practical advice and skills to those who travel with minimal gear in places where there are no roads. The 1906 printing of the pocket-manual passed through 7 editions in the space of ten years.

Kephart's work, as an instructive manual on where and how to camp, follows in the footsteps of E.R. Wallace's Descriptive Guide to the Adirondacks and Handbook of Travel (1875). Much of the material, however, used in the compilation of Kephart's book is based on the author's own first-hand experiences in the wilderness which he transcribed in the field.

== Revised edition ==
The 1916 revised edition consists of two-volumes, each volume containing 23 chapters, replete with illustrations. Among the topics discussed by the author in the first volume on Camping are Tent construction (covering a wide-variety of tents and makeshift shelters), along with their maintenance and methods used in waterproofing; Camp bedding; Clothing; Personal kits; Provisions (with the nutritional value of different foodstuffs); Camp making; the Camp fire; and Camp cookery, among other things. In the second volume on Woodcraft, the author treats on knots, hitches and lashings in the 16th chapter of this work, and discusses in its 18th chapter the manner of tanning skins, as well as brings down an inventory of edible plants found in the regions of North America with which he was familiar. Kephart also instructs his readers, in volume 2, what to do if they are ever lost in the woods, and elaborates on how to render first-aid in cases of accidents and emergencies.

Kephart occasionally draws upon his familiarity with the survival skills of the Native American Indians:

Genuine Indian-tanned buckskin is, properly speaking, not tanned at all. Tanned leather has undergone a chemical change, from the tannin or other chemicals used in converting it from the raw hide to leather. Buckskin, on the contrary, is still a raw skin that has been made supple and soft by breaking up the fibers mechanically and has then merely been treated with brains and smoke to preserve its softness. In color and pliability it is somewhat like what is called chamois skin, but it is far stronger and has the singular property that although it shrinks some after wetting and gets stiff in drying, it can easily be made soft as ever by merely rubbing it in the hands.

== Reception ==
The Boston Evening Transcript's review compared Camping and Woodcraft to a textbook in terms of completeness, and concluded that it is an "invaluable" resource for outdoor enthusiasts. The Post-Standard similarly noted: "Mr Kephart manages in this book to cover the whole subject, from underwear to snake bites." The Brooklyn Daily Eagle's review concluded that the book is "of real service and value" to both novices and those already experienced in outdoor living.

According to Morgan Simmons of the Knoxville News Sentinel, the book has gained a "diehard following" in the years since it was first published.

== See also ==
- Bushcraft
- Hiking equipment
- Survival skills
- Woodcraft

== Bibliography ==
- Kephart, H. (1916). Camping and Woodcraft; A Handbook for Vacation Campers and for Travelers in the Wilderness. Vol. 1–2 (18 ed.). New York: The Macmillan Company. ISBN 978-1-149-75236-4. OCLC 2191524. (reprinted in 1957)
- Largy, Tonya; Rainey, Mary Lynne (2006). "Poverty or Natural Wisdom: Native Home Solutions in Eighteenth-century Nantucket". Archaeology of Eastern North America. 34: 61–69. JSTOR 40914496.
- Young, Terence (2010). "On Camping and its Equipment". Environmental History. 15 (1): 120–128. doi:10.1093/envhis/emq026. JSTOR 20749646.
