= Lakeview Drive =

U.S. Road with the Great Smoky Mountains National Park

Lakeview Drive

- Route of Lakeview Drive highlighted in red

Route information
- Maintained by NPS
- Length: 6.5 mi (10.5 km)
- Existed: 1948–present

Location
- Country: United States
- State: North Carolina
- Counties: Swain

Highway system
- Scenic Byways; National; National Forest; BLM; NPS; North Carolina Highway System; Interstate; US; State; Scenic

Lakeview Drive (also known as North Shore Road and the Road to Nowhere) is a 6.5-mile-long (10.5 km) road in North Carolina, split in two segments, located along the north shore of Fontana Lake, wholly within the Great Smoky Mountains National Park. The scenic road, which was never completed, features an unused road tunnel and connects to various hiking and horse riding trails in the area.

== Route description ==
Lakeview Drive West is the shorter .7-mile (1.1 km) road segment; located at Fontana Dam, the road hugs the northwestern shore of Little Tennessee River section of Fontana Lake before ending at a parking area. Both the Appalachian Trail and Benton MacKaye Trail traverse this road segment.

Lakeview Drive East, located near Bryson City, is a 5.8-mile (9.3 km) road from Fontana Road (SR 1364) to a parking area, located less than a 1,000 feet (300 m) from the road tunnel. The road, over 5,000 feet (1,500 m) above the Tuckasegee River section of Fontana Lake, curves along Mine Mountain and Buzzardroost Mountain before crossing over Noland Creek and then ending at the edge of Tunnel Ridge. Stone facades on bridges and wooden rails along it shoulders appears similar to the Blue Ridge Parkway. The speed limit along the road is 45-mile-per-hour (72 km/h).

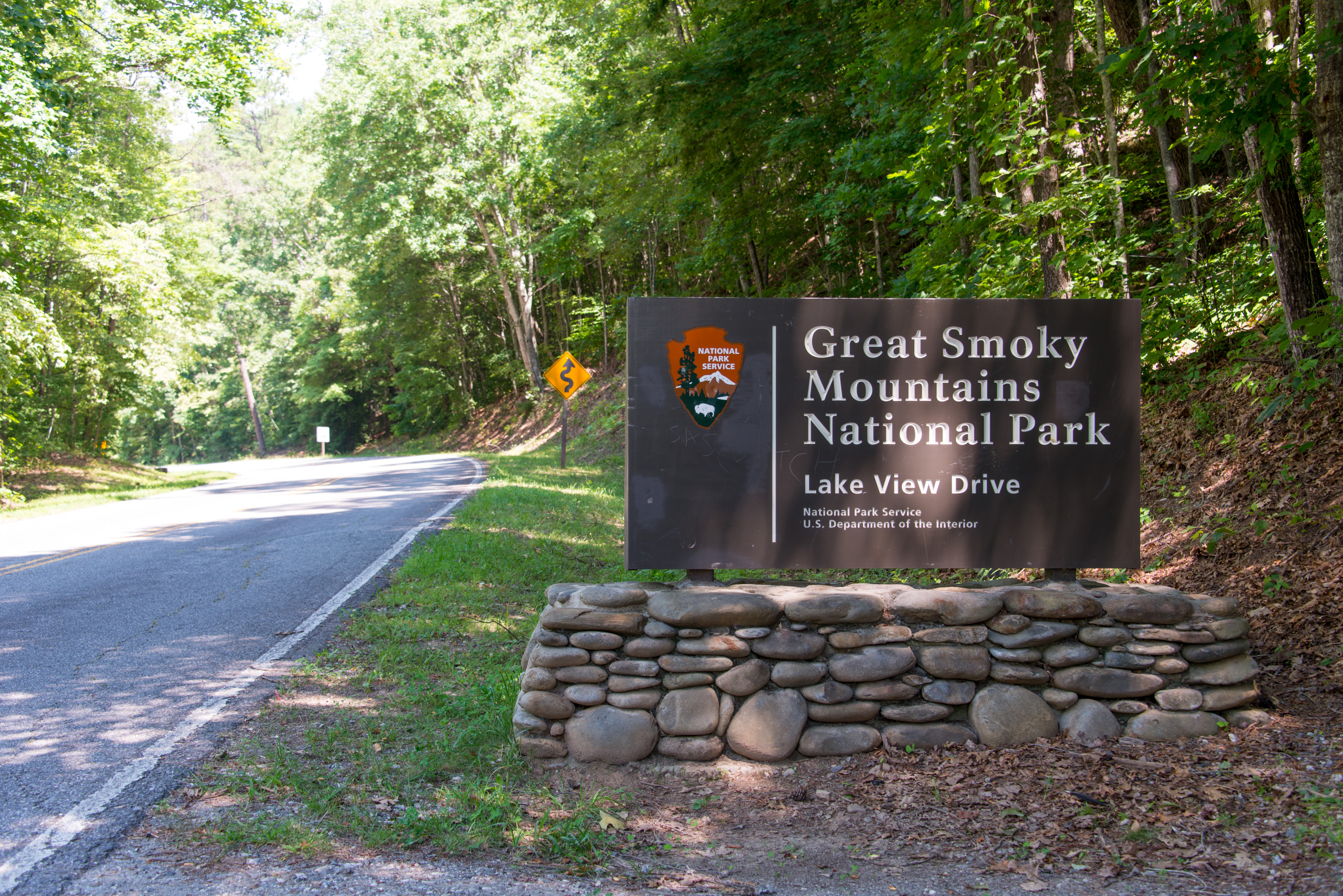
Lakeview Drive East entrance sign

Lakeshore Trail connects both segments of Lakeview Drive by following the proposed routing of the road. The 34.7-mile-long (55.8 km) trail includes the half-mile portion of road and tunnel that was never opened for vehicles. The Lakeshore Trail connects with other trails that criss-cross the Great Smoky Mountains National Park and has several campsites. Some portions of the trail follow old NC 288, where hikers may see abandoned automobiles from 1920's-1930's and a bridge at Lands Creek during the winter months, when lake levels are low.

== History ==
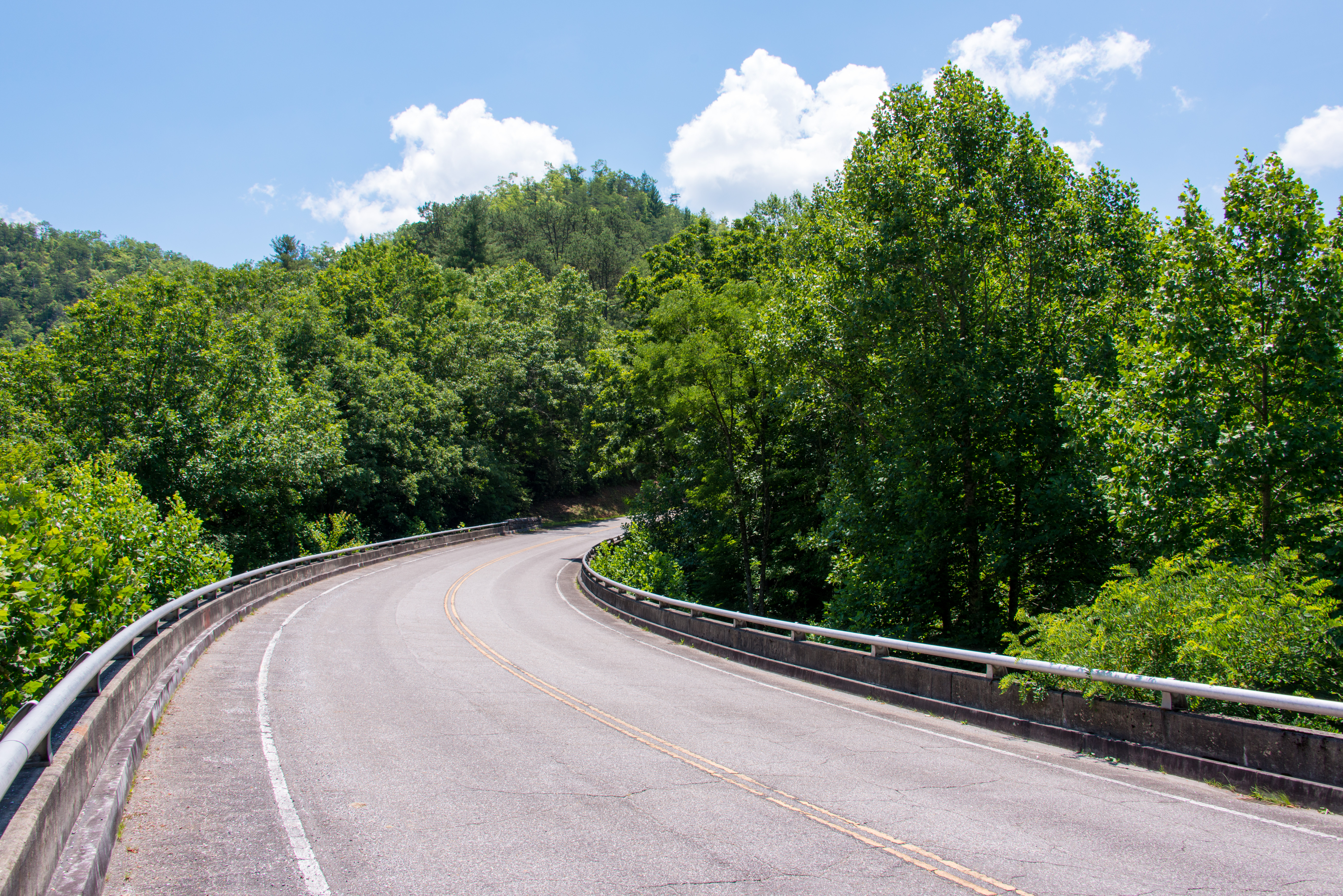
Bridge over Noland Creek

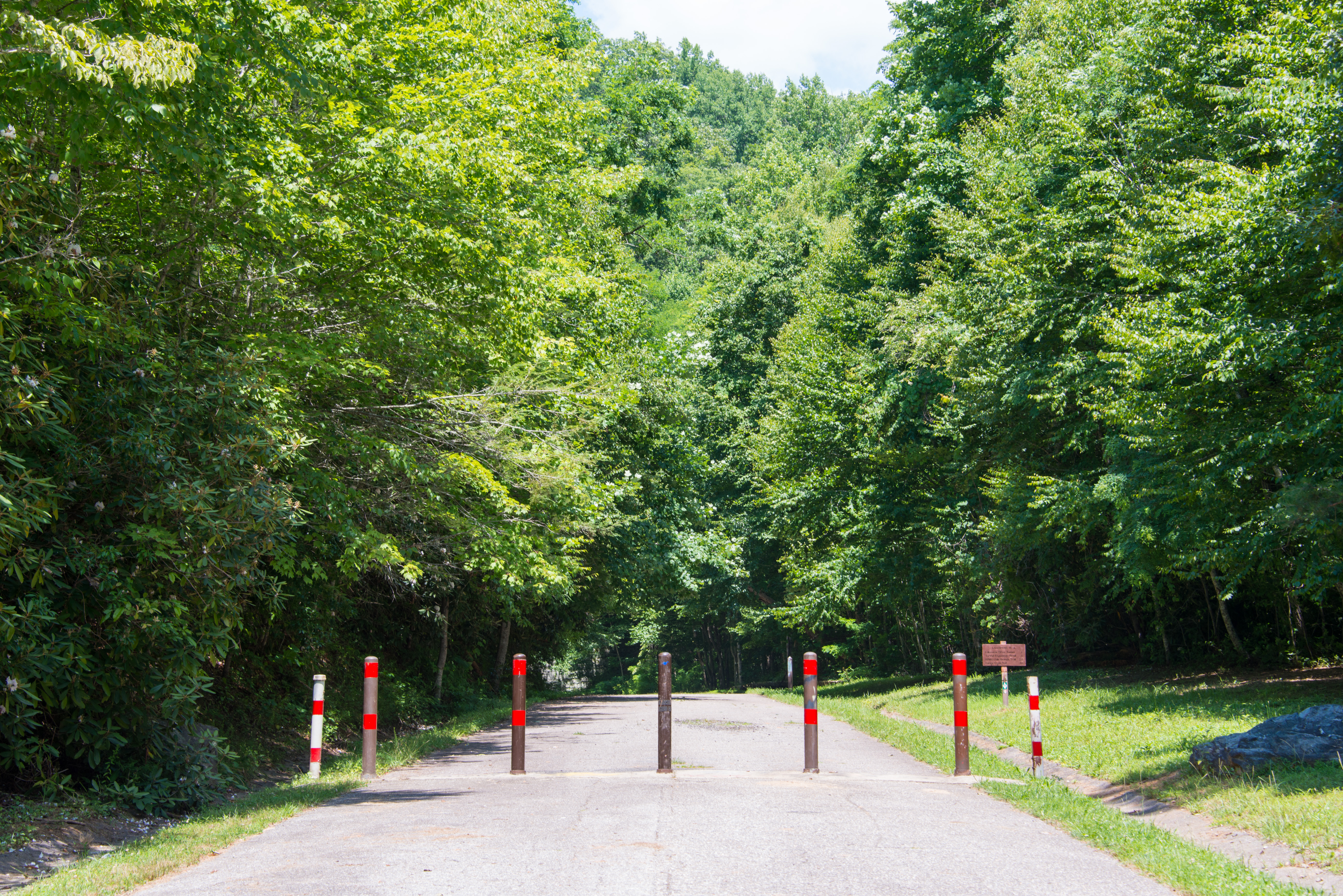
Bollards signify the road end

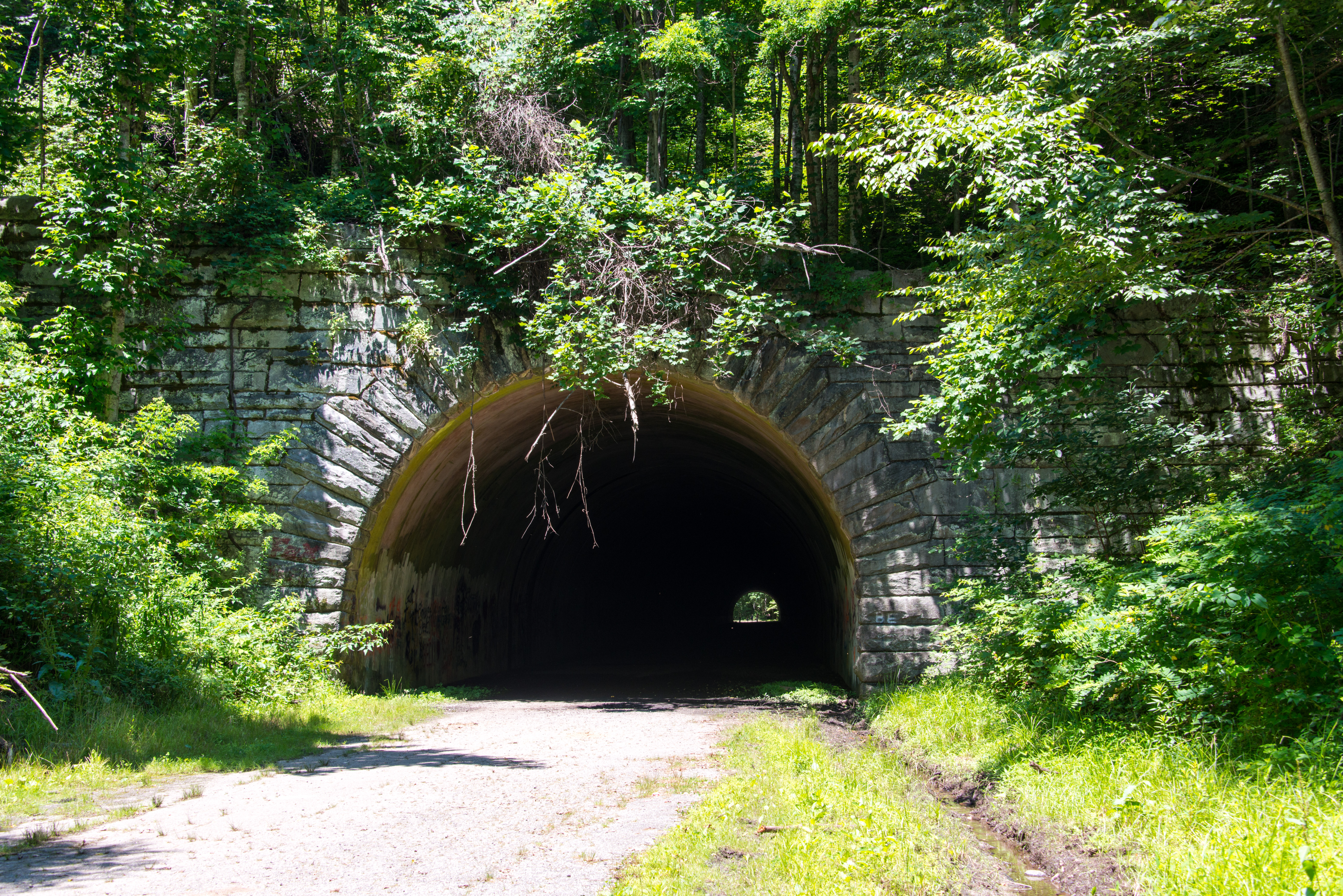
The Lakeview Drive road tunnel

On July 30, 1943, the Tennessee Valley Authority (TVA), the state of North Carolina, Swain County, and the Department of the Interior (DOI) entered into an agreement that called for:

1. TVA to pay $400,000 to the county as compensation for the flooding of North Carolina Highway 288.
2. TVA to buy the 44,000 acres (18,000 ha), displacing the residents, and to transfer the land to the National Park Service (NPS) as addition to the Great Smoky Mountains National Park.
3. DOI, contingent upon appropriation of all necessary funds, to build a replacement park road around the north side of Fontana Lake.

In 1944, Fontana Dam was completed and Fontana Lake was formed; also by this time, the TVA had fulfilled all its obligations under the agreement. After World War II, construction began on the western .7-mile (1.1 km) segment, which was completed in 1948. In 1958, North Carolina completed work on Fontana Road (SR 1364), which ends at the national park boundary. In 1960, construction began on the eastern segment, where crews quickly ran into unstable rock. In 1962, after the first 2.3 miles (3.7 km) was nearly completed, a letter from the Bureau of Public Roads asked NPS Director Conrad L. Wirth to "seriously reconsider" the plan and said that the road would become costly with damage to the area's landscape. Construction was halted by 1971, after the completion of the road tunnel and Noland Creek bridge. After $4.1 million spent on the road, environmental concerns became a pressing matter because of exposed Anakeesta rock and the possibility that the mild acid that comes from the rock could leach into nearby streams, damaging plants and fish.

Without the road, starting in the late 1970s, the NPS began providing transportation to families to visit cemeteries to which access was cut off. A pontoon boat, provided by the NPS, was used to cross Fontana Lake. The families started the North Shore Cemetery Association and continue to make occasional visits for "decoration days" on which the families clean up the cemeteries and hold services.

In 1983, a lawsuit brought by a group of Swain County residents to force the NPS to resume construction ended when the Court of Appeals for the 4th Circuit concluded that the 1943 agreement to construct the road had not been breached by DOI as Congress had not appropriated funds for the completion of the road. The court also held that DOI was under no obligation to seek further appropriations for the completion of the road.

In 2001 North Carolina Representative Charles H. Taylor inserted $16 million into the Federal Highway Administration appropriation to resume work on the road. An environmental impact statement was performed to evaluate a range of alternatives that could resolve the DOI's obligations under the 1943 agreement. The environmental impact statement resulted in a NPS record of decision on December 28, 2007, that payment of a monetary settlement to Swain County, in lieu of further construction, was the alternative that would best protect the resources of the park. Negotiations were aided by North Carolina Representative Heath Shuler and Tennessee Senator Lamar Alexander. On February 6, 2010, all signatories met in Bryson City and executed an agreement that explicitly extinguished the 1943 agreement. It called for a cash settlement of $52 million, paid to Swain County on or before December 31, 2020. Upon complete settlement, all remaining obligations that remain are considered fulfilled.

In Fall 2023, all of Lakeview Drive was closed to the public as the road was reconstructed, funded by the Great American Outdoors Act. At a cost of $15,681,860, it included a complete reconstruction of the road, replacement of all guardrails, construction of ADA accessible parking spaces, new road signs, drainage repair and other miscellaneous work.

== Junction list ==
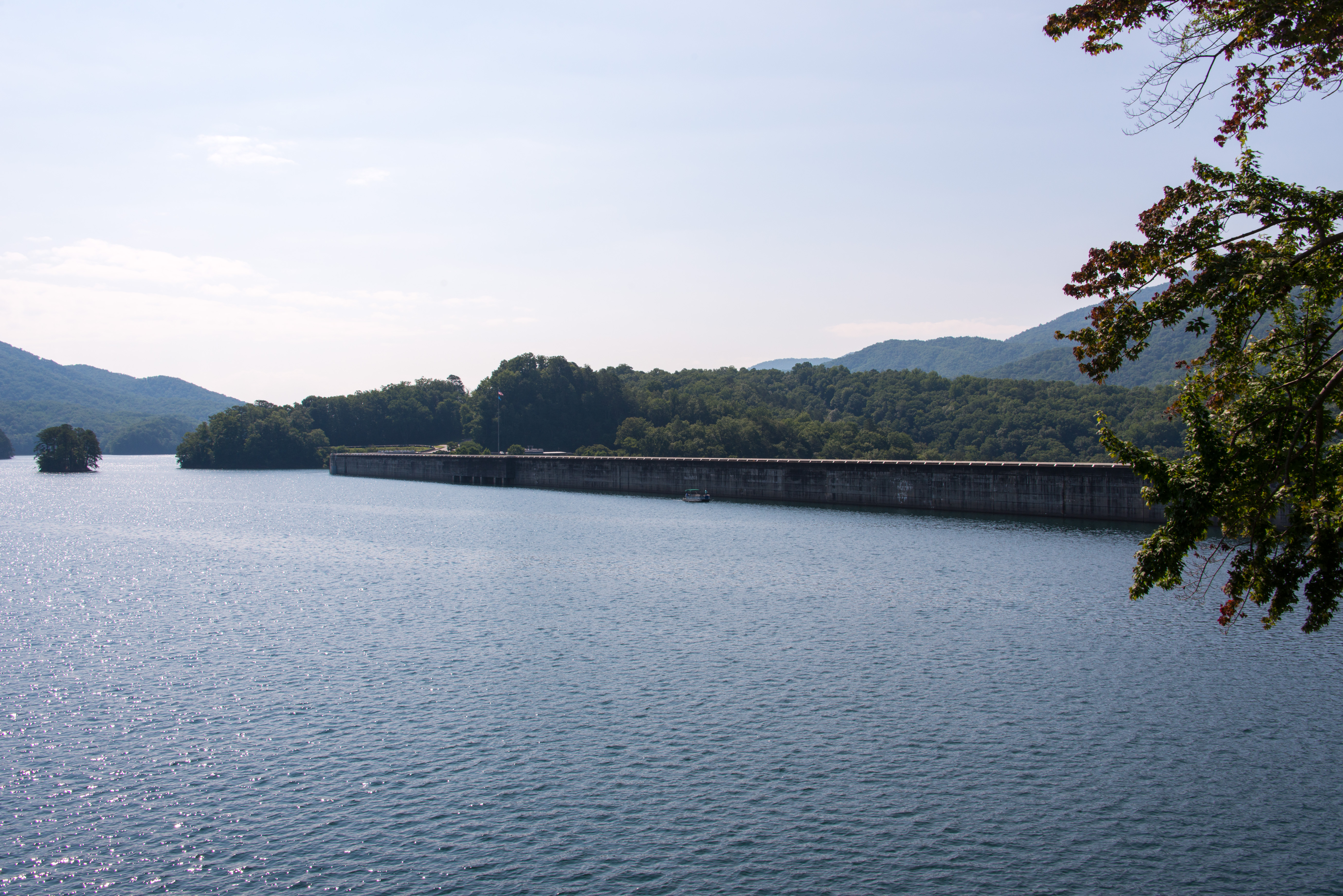
Fontana Dam and Lake, from Lakeview Drive West picnic area

The entire route is in Swain County.

Location	mi	km	Destinations	Notes
Fontana Dam	0.0	0.0	Fontana Dam Road – Fontana Village	Lakeview Drive West
Great Smoky Mountains National Park	0.7	1.1	Lakeshore Trail	Lakeview Drive West
Great Smoky Mountains National Park			Lakeview Drive Gap	
Great Smoky Mountains National Park	0.7	1.1	Lakeshore Trail	Lakeview Drive East
	6.5	10.5	Fontana Road – Bryson City	Lakeview Drive East
1.000 mi = 1.609 km; 1.000 km = 0.621 mi

== See also ==
- Blue Ridge Parkway
- Cherohala Skyway
- Foothills Parkway
- Gatlinburg Bypass
- Newfound Gap Road
