= Horace Kephart =

American writer (1862–1931)

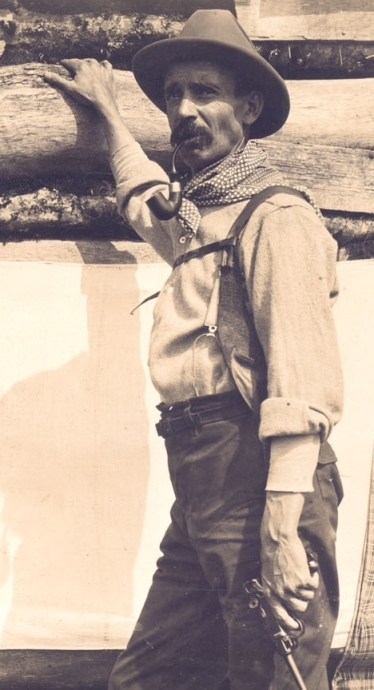
- Kephart in 1906
- Born: September 8, 1862; Juniata County, Pennsylvania, United States
- Died: April 2, 1931 (aged 68); Bryson City, North Carolina, United States
- Resting place: Bryson City Cemetery, Bryson City, North Carolina
- Education: Lebanon Valley College, Boston University, Cornell University
- Occupation: Librarian
- Spouse: Laura (Mack) Kephart
- Writing career
- Genres: Outdoor literature, Travel literature

Horace Sowers Kephart (September 8, 1862 – April 2, 1931) was an American travel writer and librarian, best known as the author of Our Southern Highlanders (a memoir about his life in the Great Smoky Mountains of western North Carolina) and the classic outdoors guide Camping and Woodcraft.

== Biography ==
Kephart was born in East Salem, Pennsylvania, and raised in Iowa. He was the director of the St. Louis Mercantile Library in St. Louis from 1890 to 1903; during these years Kephart also wrote about camping and hunting trips. Earlier, Kephart had also worked as a librarian at Yale University and spent significant time in Italy as an employee of a wealthy American book collector.

In 1904, Kephart's family (wife Laura and their six children) moved to Ithaca, New York, without him, but Laura and Horace never divorced or legally separated. Around this time, Kephart was detained by St. Louis police for erratic behavior; a related note suggests psychosis. This information was published at the time by local press and confirmed in more recent biographies. Soon Horace Kephart found his way to western North Carolina, where he lived in the Hazel Creek section of what would later become the Great Smoky Mountains National Park

I took a topographic map and picked out on it, by means of the contour lines and the blank space showing no settlement, what seemed to be the wildest part of these regions; and there I went.

Later in life Kephart campaigned for the establishment of a national park in the Great Smoky Mountains with photographer and friend George Masa, and lived long enough to know that the park would be created. He was later named one of the fathers of the national park. He also helped plot the route of the Appalachian Trail through the Smokies. Kephart died in a car accident in 1931 and was buried near Bryson City, North Carolina, a small town near the area he wrote about in Our Southern Highlanders. Two months before his death, Mount Kephart was named in his honor.

The Mountain Heritage Center and Special Collections at Hunter Library, Western Carolina University have created a digitized online exhibit called "Revealing an Enigma" that focuses on Horace Kephart's life and works. This exhibit contains documents and artifacts (photos and maps) that can be browsed or searched.

== Works ==
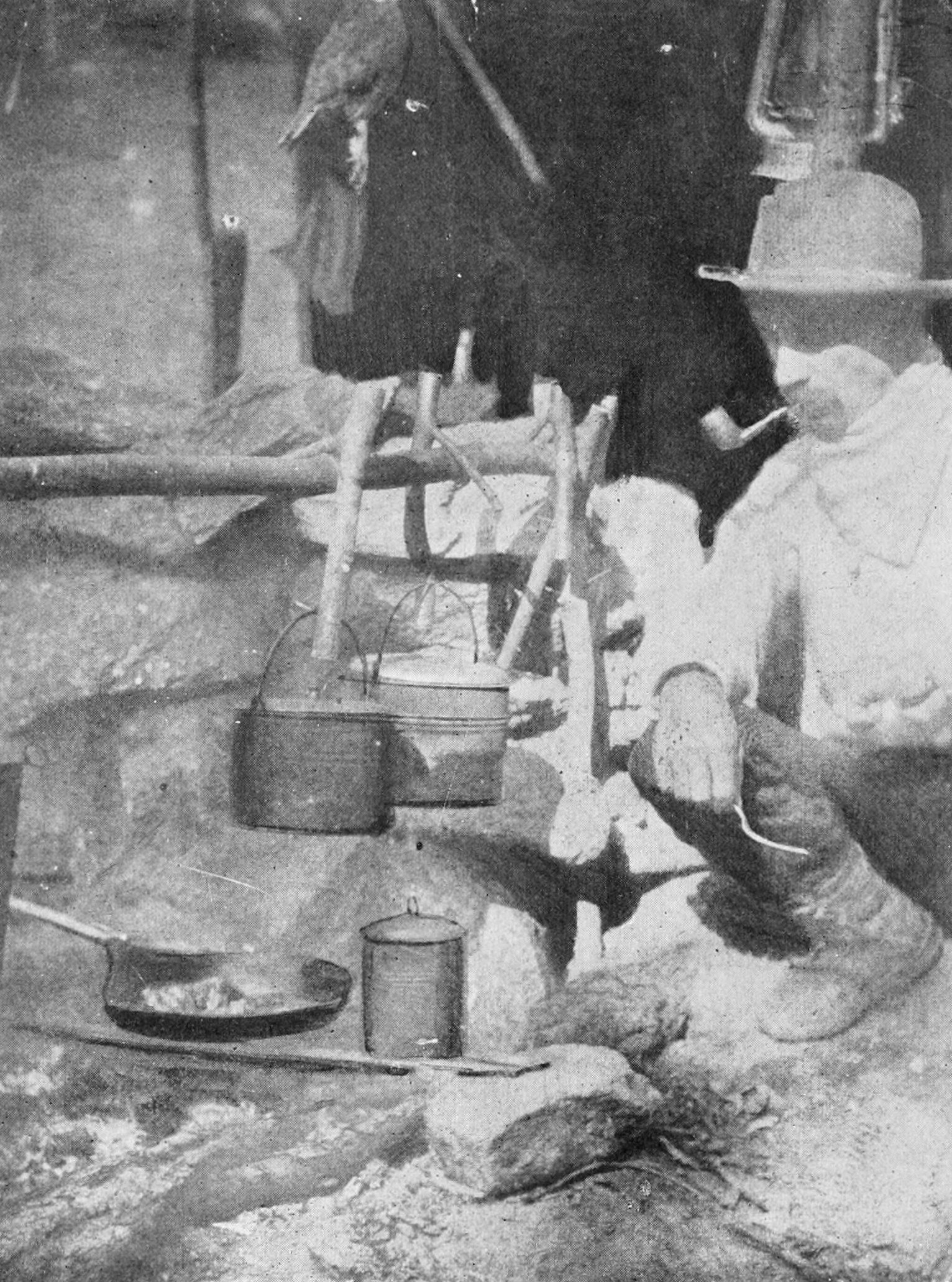
Kephart in camp in the Smokies

Kephart wrote of his experiences in a series of articles in the magazine Field & Stream. These articles were collected into his first book, Camping and Woodcraft, which was first published in 1906. While mostly a manual of living outdoors, Kephart interspersed his philosophy:

Your thoroughbred camper likes not the attentions of a landlord, nor will he suffer himself to be rooted to the soil by cares of ownership or lease. It is not possession of the land, but of the landscape, that enjoys; and as for that, all the wild parts of the earth are his, by a title that carries with it no obligation but that he shall not desecrate nor lay them waste. Houses, to such a one, in summer are little better than cages; fences and walls are his abomination; plowed fields are only so many patches of torn and tormented earth. The sleek comeliness of pasture it too prim and artificial, domestic cattle have a meek and ignoble bearing, fields of grain are monotonous to his eyes, which turn for relief to abandoned old-field, overgrown with thicket, that still harbors some the shy children of the wild. It is not the clearing but the unfenced wilderness that is the camper's real home. He is brother to that good old friend of mine who in gentle satire of our formal gardens and close- cropped lawns, was wont to say, 'I love the unimproved works of God.'

He published other books of the same theme such as Camp Cookery (1910) and Sporting Firearms (1912). He wrote The Hunting Rifle section of Guns, Ammunition and Tackle (New York: Macmillan, 1904), a volume of Caspar Whitney's prestigious American Sportsman's Library. Combining his own experience and observations with other written studies, Kephart wrote a study of Appalachian lifestyles and culture called Our Southern Highlanders, published in 1913 and expanded in 1922. In 1925, Kephart wrote a long editorial explaining why the Smoky Mountains should be recognized as a national park. He later wrote and published a short history of the Cherokee and other books which became standards in the field. Kephart completed a typescript for a novel in 1929. However, the book was not edited and published until 2009, when it was published under the title Smoky Mountain Magic by Great Smoky Mountains Association.

== See also ==
- Woodcraft
