= Gregory Bald =

Mountain within the Great Smoky Mountains

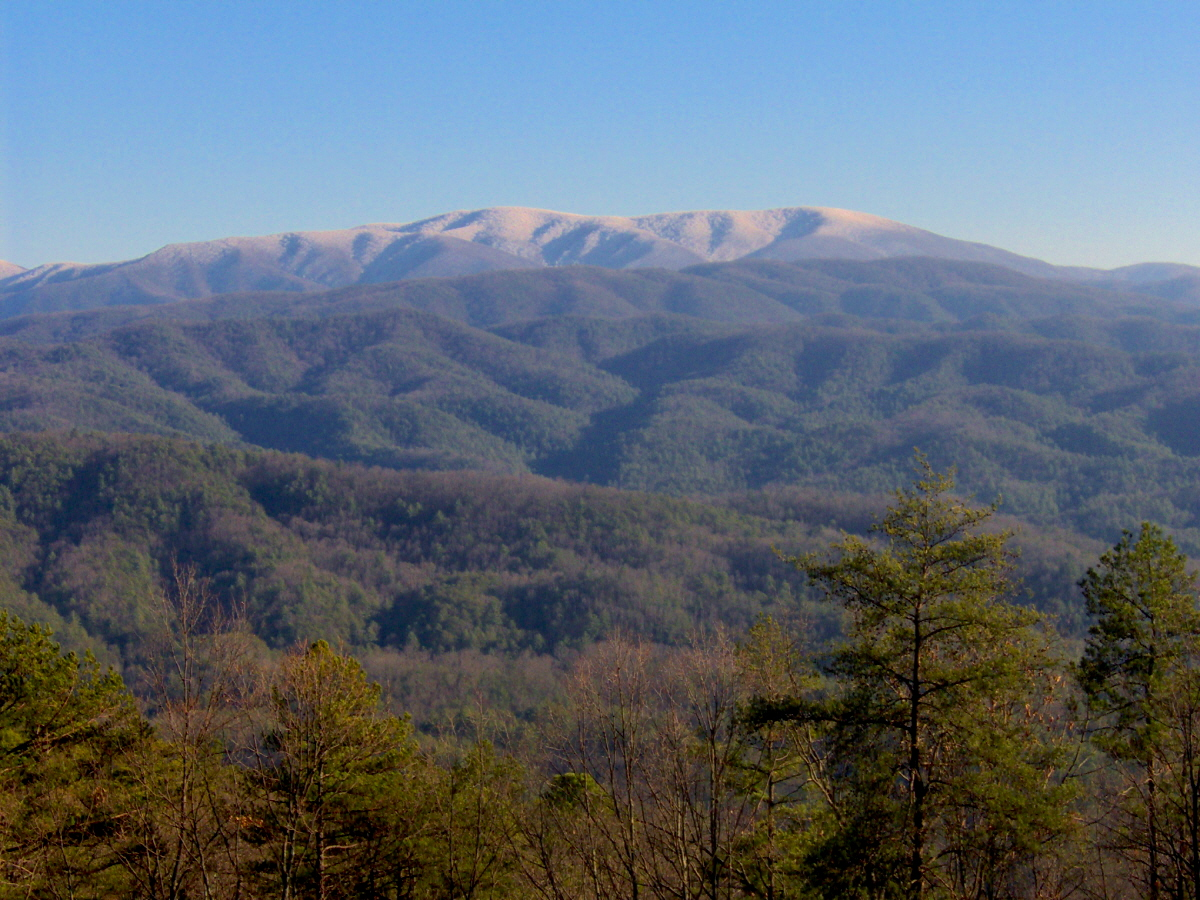
- Gregory Bald, snow-capped, looking south from Foothills Parkway

Highest point
- Elevation: 4,949 ft (1,508 m)
- Prominence: 1,107 ft (337 m)
- Coordinates: 35.5206°N 83.8661°W

Geography
- Location: Blount County, Tennessee / Swain County, North Carolina, U.S.
- Parent range: Great Smoky Mountains
- Topo map: USGS Gregory Bald

Climbing
- Easiest route: Gregory Ridge Trail + Gregory Bald Trail

Gregory Bald is a mountain in the Great Smoky Mountains. It has an elevation of 4,949 feet (1,508 meters) above sea level. The mountain's majestic summit makes it a popular hiking destination. Another feature that attracts many visitors are the flame azaleas that bloom over the bald every summer. The azaleas reach peak bloom around mid-to-late June.

Gregory Bald is located along the Tennessee-North Carolina border, between Blount County and Swain County. It rises approximately 3,000 feet above its northern base in Cades Cove, and approximately 3,300 feet above its southern base at Fontana Lake. The mountain is located entirely within the Great Smoky Mountains National Park.

Gregory Bald is a type of mountain known as a grassy bald. Unlike most summits in the Appalachian Mountains, which are heavily forested or culminate in jagged peaks, grassy balds are covered by a thick layer of wild grass. Trees and other foliage are sparse. How and why a summit develops into a grassy bald is unknown. While there is evidence that Gregory Bald was a natural grassy bald, the National Park Service must currently work to prevent the summit from becoming forested.

== Geology ==
Gregory Bald is composed of Precambrian rock known as Elkmont sandstone. In a few places atop the mountain, sandstone ruts actually erupt through the thick grass. The Elkmont sandstone is part of the Ocoee Supergroup, which was formed from ancient ocean sediments between 500 million and one billion years ago. Gregory Bald, along with most mountains in the area, was formed appx. 200 million years ago during the Appalachian orogeny.

== History ==
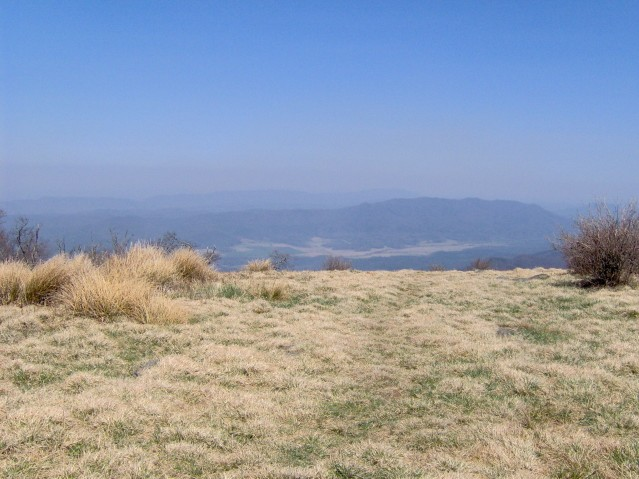
View from the summit of Gregory Bald, looking northeast. Cades Cove is the strip of land in the valley below.

The Cherokee name for Gregory Bald was "Tsistu'yi," or "Rabbit Place." According to tribal lore, the chief of all rabbits—known simply as the Great Rabbit—lived at the summit. The rabbit, considered by the Cherokee to be sly and mischievous, was a key figure in tribal legends, showing the importance the tribe placed upon the mountain.

The mountain was listed by Arnold Guyot in his 1856 survey of the Smokies, although Guyot gave it the name "Great Bald's Central Peak", and measured its elevation at 4,922 feet. The name "Gregory Bald" was given to the mountain by Cades Cove residents in honor of Russell Gregory (1795–1864), a prominent Cades Cove settler. He and two other settlers made a deal to each take 1/3 of the land to live upon. Gregory used the mountain to graze cattle during the spring and summer, when the fields in the cove were needed for growing crops. He lived atop the mountain during this part of the year in a circular stone house near the mountain's summit (the house is no longer standing). Gregory, who (like most Cades Covers) supported the Union during the American Civil War. Gregory was murdered by a Confederate soldier in 1864 while trying to protect his cattle and land. His grave bears the legend "Murdered by North Carolina rebels".

== Access ==
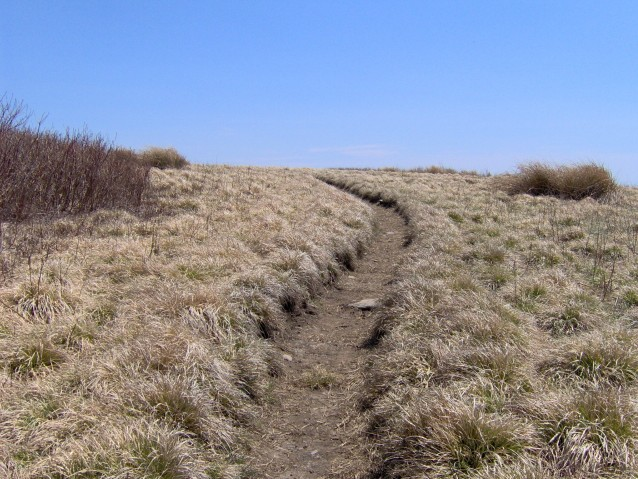
The Gregory Bald Trail approaching the summit.

The summit of Gregory Bald can be reached via several well-maintained hiking trails. From Cades Cove, the summit can be reached via the Gregory Ridge Trail or the Gregory Bald Trail. Gregory Ridge Trail begins at the end of Forge Creek Road, which is a gravel road on the Cades Cove Loop just past the Cable Mill area. Gregory Bald Trail is accessed via the unimproved Parsons Branch Road. From Fontana, the summit is reached via the Appalachian Trail and a two-mile connector trail. From Twentymile, the summit is reached via the Wolf Ridge Trail.

From the summit, one can see Cades Cove and Rich Mountain to the north, and the Nantahala and Yellow Creek Mountains to the south. Visible to the east is the crest of the Smokies, including Thunderhead Mountain and Kuwohi. Fontana Lake and Shuckstack are discernible to the southeast.
