= Fontana Lake =

Man-made reservoir in North Carolina, United States

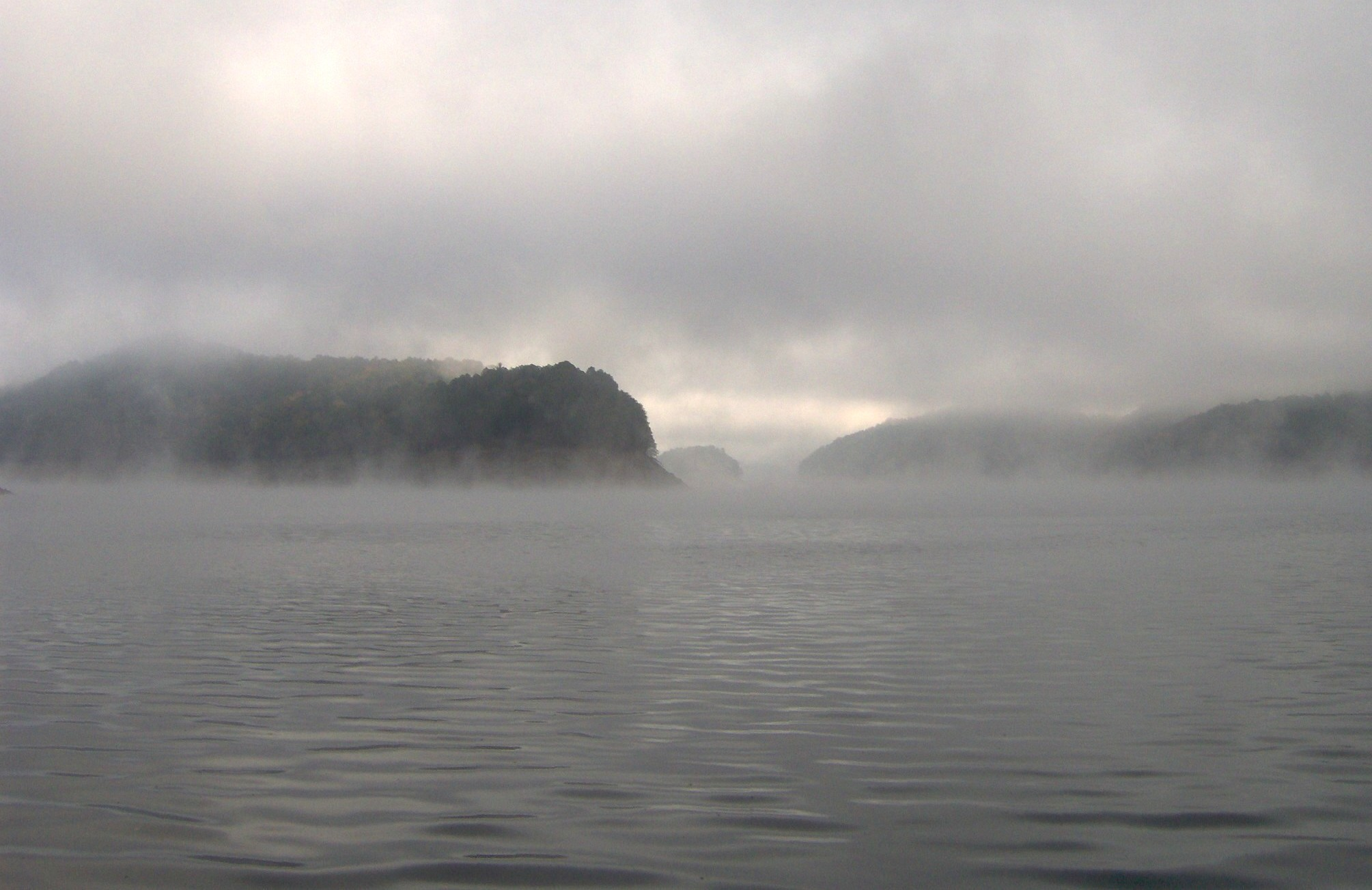
- Fontana Lake

- Location within North Carolina Location within the United States
- Location: Graham / Swain counties, North Carolina, United States
- Coordinates: 35°27′10″N 083°48′18″W
- Type: reservoir
- Primary inflows: Little Tennessee River; Nantahala River
- Primary outflows: Little Tennessee River
- Basin countries: United States
- Max. length: 17 miles (27 km)
- Average depth: 135 ft (41 m)
- Max. depth: 440 ft (130 m)
- Surface elevation: 1,703 ft (519 m)

Fontana Lake is a reservoir impounded by Fontana Dam on the Little Tennessee River, and is located in Graham and Swain counties in North Carolina. The lake forms part of the southern border of Great Smoky Mountains National Park and the northern border of part of the Nantahala National Forest. Depending on water levels, the lake is about 17 miles (27 km) long. The eastern end is the Tuckasegee River near Bryson City. It has an average depth of 135 feet (41 m) and reaches a maximum depth of 440 feet (130 m), making it the deepest lake in North Carolina. The lake has many inlets into coves and many islands formed from former mountain peaks, especially near the eastern end. As with most dam-impounded lakes, the steep banks are exposed when water levels are low. Many towns were submerged shortly after the creation of Fontana Lake, such as Proctor, Judson, and the town of Fontana itself. More than 1,300 families were displaced by the creation of the reservoir. The federal government promised to construct a road on the north shore to connect displaced families to their graveyards. After six miles and a tunnel, work stopped prematurely. In 2010, the federal government paid Swain County $52 million in lieu of completion.

Fontana Lake provides the only access into the most remote areas of the National Park, unless visitors undertake a multi-day hike to get there. When the lake is at the normal summer level, a boat may be used to access remote trailheads such as Hazel Creek. From the observation tower on Kuwohi, on a clear day the lake can be seen nearly a mile below. While the maximum controlled elevation of the lake (top of dam gates) is 1,710 ft (520 m), the normal Summer surface elevation is 1,703 ft (519 m). NC 28 roughly parallels the southern shore of the lake, and US 19, between Bryson City and Wesser/Lauada, briefly skims an inlet at the extreme southeastern edge.

== Name ==
Fontana is named after a Montvale Lumber Company logging town that was once situated at the mouth of Eagle Creek on the lake's north shore. The name is derived from the Italian word for "fountain".

== See also ==
- Hazel Creek (Great Smoky Mountains)
