= Disappearance of Dennis Martin =

Missing American child

Dennis Martin
- Born: June 20, 1962
- Disappeared: June 14, 1969 (aged 6); Spence Field, Great Smoky Mountains National Park, Tennessee, U.S.
- Status: Missing for 57 years, 5 months and 7 days
- Known for: Extensive search
- Father: William Clyde Martin
- Relatives: Clyde Demetrius Martin (grandfather)
- Family: Douglas Martin (brother)

Dennis Lloyd Martin (born June 20, 1962) was an American child who disappeared on June 14, 1969, in the Great Smoky Mountains National Park in Tennessee at the age of six, six days before his seventh birthday. The search effort was the most extensive in the park's history, involving approximately 1,400 searchers and a 56-square-mile (150 km^{2}) area.

== Disappearance ==
Dennis Martin, a six-year-old resident of Knoxville, was visiting the Great Smoky Mountains National Park along with his father, grandfather and older brother on Father's Day weekend in 1969. The camping trip was a family tradition for the Martins. The family hiked from Cades Cove to Russell Field and camped overnight. The next day, they hiked to Spence Field near the Appalachian Trail, where they planned to spend the night.

Martin disappeared on June 14 at 16:30 while planning on surprising the adults with his brother and other children from a separate family the Martins were camping with; he was last seen by his father going behind a bush to hide, intending on surprising the adults walking down the trail with the other children. Martin was wearing a bright red shirt, which the children perceived would give away his location. He therefore took a more roundabout route. Martin's father had spotted the group of children crouched at the side of the trail in the bushes. After not seeing him for about five minutes and when all of the other children had returned to the camp site, his father became concerned and began searching for him. His father ran down the trail for nearly two miles, until he was sure he could not have gotten any farther. After several hours, they sought help from National Park Service rangers.

The area where Martin disappeared is marked by steep slopes and ravines. Wild animals such as copperhead snakes, bears, feral hogs, and bobcats inhabit the area. A downpour broke out shortly after Martin's disappearance, dropping 3 inches (7.6 cm) of rain in a matter of hours, which washed out trails and caused streams to flood. Temperatures on the night of June 14 dropped to nearly 50 °F (10 °C).

== Investigation ==
Search efforts, including a separate search by the National Guard and Green Berets found no trace. Heavy rains during the first day's search and heavy mist the next days hampered efforts. Up to 1,400 people were involved in the search effort, potentially obscuring possible clues. Footprints were found in the area, but were dismissed from the possibility of being Martin's by park officials, who determined them to have been left instead by a Boy Scout participating in the search. The child-sized footprints led to a stream, where they disappeared. The tracks indicated that one foot was barefoot, while the other was in an Oxford (the type of shoe Martin was wearing) or a tennis shoe. Retired park ranger and author Dwight McCarter, who participated in the search, believes that the prints likely belonged to Martin, as the tracks were not part of a group and none of the Boy Scouts were searching while barefoot.

By June 22, 56 square miles (150 km^{2}) of ground had been covered. More than a thousand searchers continued to look until June 26, when the search was cut back. The search was abandoned on June 29, after a last search. The search was officially closed down on September 14, 1969. As of 2025, it is still the largest search in the history of Great Smoky Mountains National Park.

== Aftermath ==
Dennis's father offered a US$5,000 (equivalent to $43,897 in 2025) reward for information. A few years after, a ginseng-hunter claimed to have discovered the scattered skeletal remains of a small child in Big Hollow, Tremont. He kept the find to himself until 1985 because of fear that he would be prosecuted for the illegal ginseng. A subsequent search turned up nothing. The location that the man gave was not far from the footprints that were thought to have belonged to Martin.

The immense size of the search party was blamed as one of the reasons for its failure. The participants were said to be too numerous to manage and often too inexperienced. The unsuccessful search for Martin led the National Park Service to review and amend its policies on searches for missing people, focusing on search parties of a small number of trained individuals instead of trying to maximize the number of participants.

== Theories ==
Three main theories exist about what happened to Martin.

- The first is that he became lost and perished from exposure or some other cause, likely not long after the first night. This is the most probable theory according to park officials.
- The second is that he was attacked by a bear (or, less likely, a feral pig) and carried off.
- The third is that he was abducted and taken out of the park by someone. His father was a proponent of the third theory. On the afternoon that Martin disappeared, tourist Harold Key and his family heard an "enormous, sickening scream" and shortly thereafter witnessed an unkempt, shaggy, rough looking man running up the trail near where the scream had come from. Key also claimed the shaggy man was carrying "cloth or clothing" and it was red, the color shirt Dennis was wearing over his shoulder. Harold Key claims his sighting happened roughly an hour after the disappearance of Dennis Martin and a mere five miles from the incident. Park Rangers and the Federal Bureau of Investigation concluded that there was insufficient evidence to link the sighting to Martin's disappearance, particularly given that Key's sighting was approximately five miles away from where Martin disappeared, and closer to seven or nine miles by trails, and the difficulty of traversing such a distance in the amount of time between when Martin disappeared and the time that Key provided for when the incident occurred.

The abduction theory was featured on the Hulu series Out There: Crimes Of The Paranormal (2024) episode titled "Smoky Mountain Nightmare". The episode aired September 24, 2024.

== See also ==
- List of people who disappeared

== Sources ==
- Carolyn Atkin (June 20, 1969). "Only A Search Party On his 7th Birthday". Kingsport Times. p. 13 – via newspapers.com.
- Hayley Martin (December 10, 2008). "Great Smoky Mountain Disappearance". Tennessee Journalist. The University of Tennessee. Archived from the original on August 7, 2013.
