= Forney Ridge Trail =

Hiking trail in North Carolina, United States

- Length: 5.6 mi (1.8 to Andrews Bald); 9.0 km (2.9 to Andrews Bald)
- Location: Great Smoky Mountains National Park, North Carolina, United States
- Trailheads: At the base of the paved trail to the Kuwohi observation tower, inside of the Great Smoky Mountains National Park, off of U.S. Highway 441 (Newfound Gap Road); Terminus at junction with Springhouse Branch Trail
- Use: Hiking
- Elevation change: 2,600 ft (790 m)
- Highest point: Trailhead at Kuwohi
- Lowest point: Terminus at Board Camp Gap
- Difficulty: Easy (to falls); Moderate (to lookout tower)
- Season: Spring to Fall
- Sights: Andrews Bald, Great Smoky Mountains
- Hazards: Rocky Trail

The Forney Ridge Trail is an American hiking trail, in the Great Smoky Mountains National Park of Swain County, North Carolina. The trail descends from just beneath the highest summit in the national park, Kuwohi, along Forney Ridge and passes through Andrews Bald, at an elevation of 5,920 feet, before terminating at a junction with the Springhouse Branch Trail.

== Vital information ==
- Due to its location high in the crest of the Great Smoky Mountains, the Forney Ridge Trail is one of very few in the national park that actually descends from its trailhead.
- The trailhead is located just at the front end of the Kuwohi parking area, about 7 miles (11 km) from U.S. Highway 441 (Newfound Gap Road).

== Landmarks and overlooks ==
- Kuwohi (via half mile; paved trail near the trailhead)
- Forney Ridge
- Andrews Bald

== Trail synopsis ==
=== Trailhead to Andrews Bald ===
The Forney Ridge Trail begins easily enough at the base of the paved trail to the Kuwohi observation tower. The first 0.1 miles (0.16 km) of the trail consists of a series of leveled, rocky platforms, put together by the national park service apparently due to the previously hazardous, steep, rocky slope. At the end of these "stairs" the trail comes to a fork with a side trail that leads on to the Appalachian Trail about a half mile up (and not far past that to the observation tower at Kuwohi), and the Forney Ridge Trail continuing on to the left, down along the ridge for which it is named.

Although the trail is relatively easy, it is advisable to use caution. The early portion can be slippery in icy winters and may contain loose rocks. In the 1920s the trees here were swept by a wildfire which has given the area an awkward mix of young shrubbery and woods, but this portion is rather short and within a mile the trail passes into the spruce-fir zone, which has also had problems more recently with air pollution and the balsam wooly adelgid. At 1.1 miles (1.8 km) the trail comes to a split with the Forney Creek Trail, which, to the right, leads down 11 miles (18 km) to Fontana Lake.

From here the trail rises up for about a quarter mile, the only such jaunt along its path, before leveling out and gently sloping back down to Andrews Bald at 1.8 miles (2.9 km). Andrews Bald is a grassy bald and, at 5,920 feet (1,800 m), it is the highest bald in the national park. In mid-June, the bald provides a display of Catawba rhododendron and flame azalea. Due to the natural encroachment of the forest onto the once grazed open balds in the park, Andrews Bald (along with Gregory Bald) has been designated as an experimental research zone, whereby the national park service will preserve the area as a grassy bald.

=== Andrews Bald to Springhouse Branch Trail ===
Down past Andrews Bald, the Forney Ridge Trail continues its descent down Forney Ridge, eventually coming down to Board Camp Gap and its junction with the Springhouse Branch Trail at 5.6 miles (9.0 km). This trail can be taken in conjunction with the Noland and then later Forney Creek Trails back up to the Forney Ridge Parking Area for a long 18 miles (29 km) backpacking loop, or, by turning left at the Forney Creek Trail, down to Fontana Lake in North Carolina.

== Sources ==
- Manning, Russ; Sondra Jamieson (1991). The Best of the Great Smoky Mountains National Park: A Hikers Guide to Trails and Attractions. Norris, Tennessee: Mountain Laurel Place. ISBN 0-9625122-2-2.
- Brewer, Carson (1962). Hiking in the Great Smokies. Norris, Tennessee: Newman/National.
