= Spence Field =

Mountain highland meadow in Southeastern U.S.

Coordinates: 35°33′48″N 83°43′58″W

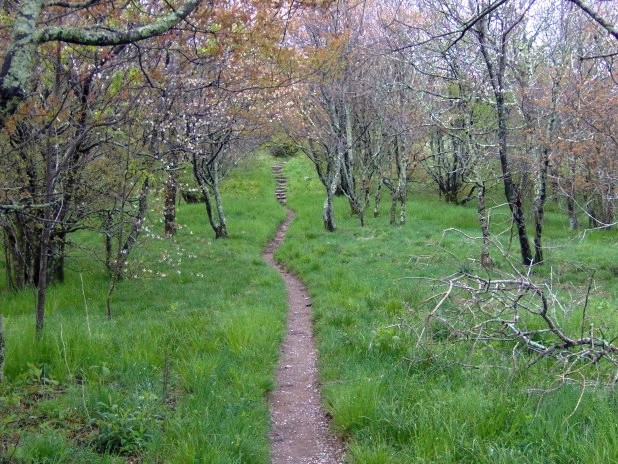
The Appalachian Trail crossing Spence Field, looking east.

Spence Field is a mountain highland meadow in the Great Smoky Mountains, located in the Southeastern United States. It has an elevation of 4,920 feet (1,500 m) above sea level. The Appalachian Trail traverses the field, and a backcountry shelter just off the trail provides an overnight stopover for through-hikers.

Like much of the Smokies crest, Spence Field lies along the Tennessee-North Carolina border, between Blount County and Swain County. It rises 3,000 feet (910 m) above Cades Cove to the north and 3,300 feet (1,000 m) above Fontana Lake to the south. The "field" spreads out atop the crest, covering approximately 200 acres (0.8 km^{2}).

Spence Field is a crossroads of sorts of the Western Smokies. The Appalachian Trail crosses the field from east to west, and is joined by the Bote Mountain Trail from the north and the Eagle Creek Trail from the south. The Bote Mountain Trail connects Spence Field with Cades Cove, Little River Road, and Tremont. The Eagle Creek Trail connects Spence with the Benton MacKaye Trail and Fontana Lake. Along the A.T., Thunderhead Mountain is just two miles (3 km) to the east, and Gregory Bald is just over 10 miles (16 km) to the west.

Spence Field is a grassy bald, a type of meadow found in higher elevations in the Appalachian Mountains. Grassy balds are characterized by thick grass and relatively sparse tree coverage. In the late 19th and early 20th centuries, Spence Field was roughly at the center of a 24-mile (39 km) pasture that stretched across the crest of the Western Smokies from Gregory Bald in the west all the way to Silers Bald to the east. Since the establishment of the Great Smoky Mountains National Park in the 1930s, however, wooded plants have started reclaiming much of this stretch, including Spence. The park service currently maintains the grassy balds atop Gregory Bald and Andrews Bald, while allowing the others to return to their natural state.

== History ==
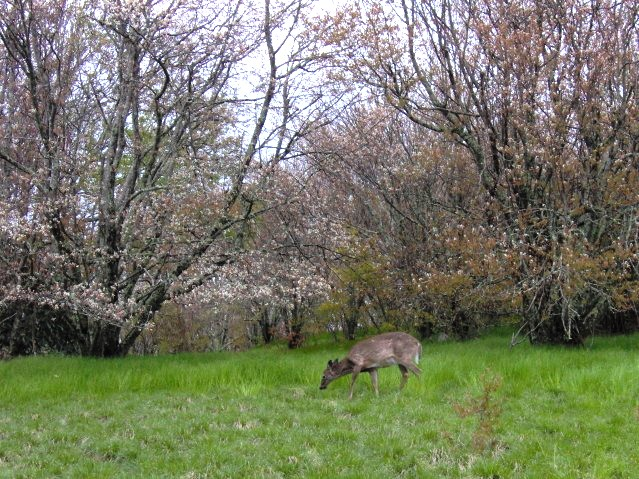
Deer grazing at Spence Field.

Spence Field is named after James Spence, a settler who built a cabin at the field in 1830. Spence and his wife, Caroline Law, were connected with the Cades Cove area, but preferred the solitude of the high mountains. They lived and herded livestock at Spence Field during the warmer months, only rarely visiting the lower elevations. Historian Durwood Dunn, describing the Spences' eschewal of the more populated bottomlands, explains:

A few days before the birth of their son Robert in 1840, she (Caroline Spence) walked alone ten miles to their home in the White Oak Cove in order to be near neighbors who could assist her. Other than such emergencies as childbirth and the approach of winter, however, nothing could induce them to leave their mountain.

John Oliver, the first settler in Cades Cove, claimed that Spence burned trees and cleared Spence Field in the 1830s, lending credence to the argument that Spence Field is not a natural bald. Regardless, the field was still being used as a summer-time pasture in 1900, where thousands of cows, horses, sheep, and goats grazed while the bottomlands were used for planting crops.

Arnold Guyot, who surveyed much of the Smokies crest in the late 1850s, measured the elevation of "Spence cabin" at 4,910 feet (1,500 m). Author Horace Kephart frequented Spence Field— specifically a herder's shack at Spence known as "Spencer cabin"— in the early 1900s.

== Access ==
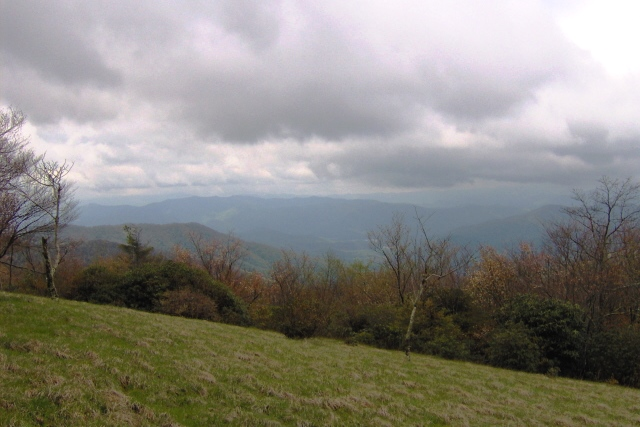
Looking southeast from Spence Field.

The Bote Mountain Trail, which intersects the Appalachian Trail at Spence Field, can be accessed at its trailhead along Little River Road or via several spur trails. From this trailhead, it is approximately 7 miles (11 km) to Spence. From the Lead Cove trailhead, also on Little River Road, it is approximately 5 miles (8.0 km) to Spence. From Cades Cove (via the Anthony Creek Trail, which rises out of the campground), it is approximately 5.2 miles (8.4 km) to Spence Field.

The Eagle Creek trailhead is located on the north side of Fontana Dam, and rises 14 miles (23 km) to Spence Field. The 9-mile (14 km) Jenkins Ridge Trail connects Spence Field with the remote Hazel Creek area, in the southwestern Smokies.

The Spence Field Shelter can accommodate 12 backpackers. A permit is required for overnight use. The shelter is located along the Eagle Creek Trail, approximately 100 meters south of the Appalachian Trail junction. The Russell Field and Mollies Ridge shelters are just a few miles to the west.
