= Bote Mountain =

Mountain in Tennessee, United States

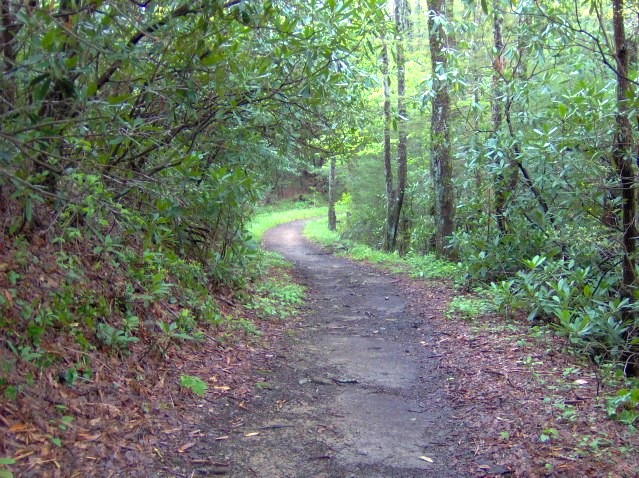
- Bote Mountain Trail

Highest point
- Elevation: 2,841 ft (866 m)
- Parent peak: Cold Water Knob
- Coordinates: 35°36′32″N 83°43′34″W

Geography
- Location within Tennessee
- Location: Blount County, Tennessee, United States
- Parent range: Great Smoky Mountains, Appalachian Range
- Topo map: USGS Thunderhead Mountain

Geology
- Rock age: Late Precambrian
- Mountain type: Fold

Climbing
- Easiest route: Hike

Bote Mountain is a mountain in Great Smoky Mountains National Park of Tennessee, in the United States.

Bote Mountain is located in the Great Smoky Mountains, which began forming in the late Carboniferous and through the early Triassic, approximately 310 to 245 million years ago. The oldest rocks of the Great Smoky Mountains, however, date from the Neoproterozoic, approximately 800 million years ago.

The Bote Mountain Trail follows the crest of the mountain, and intersects the Appalachian Trail at Spence Field.
