= Ocoee Supergroup =

Rock formation in the Appalachian Mountains

- Stratigraphic range: Neoproterozoic (traditional assignment; see §Age and controversies)
- Type: Supergroup
- Sub-units: Snowbird Group, Great Smoky Group, Walden Creek Group; Pine Mountain Group (Georgia)
- Thickness: Up to ~15 km reported in the Great Smoky Mountains region; commonly cited as ~9,000 m (30,000 ft) in the park area

Lithology
- Primary: Predominantly metasedimentary clastic rocks (metamorphosed sandstone, siltstone, shale/argillite; locally conglomerate); minor carbonate layers in parts of the Walden Creek Group

Location
- Region: Blue Ridge (southern Appalachian Mountains)
- Country: United States

Type section
- Named for: Ocoee River

The Ocoee Supergroup is a thick succession of predominantly metasedimentary rocks exposed in the Blue Ridge Mountains of the southern Appalachian Mountains in the United States. It underlies much of the high-elevation core of the Great Smoky Mountains and adjacent ranges, and is widely mapped in Tennessee, North Carolina, and Georgia.

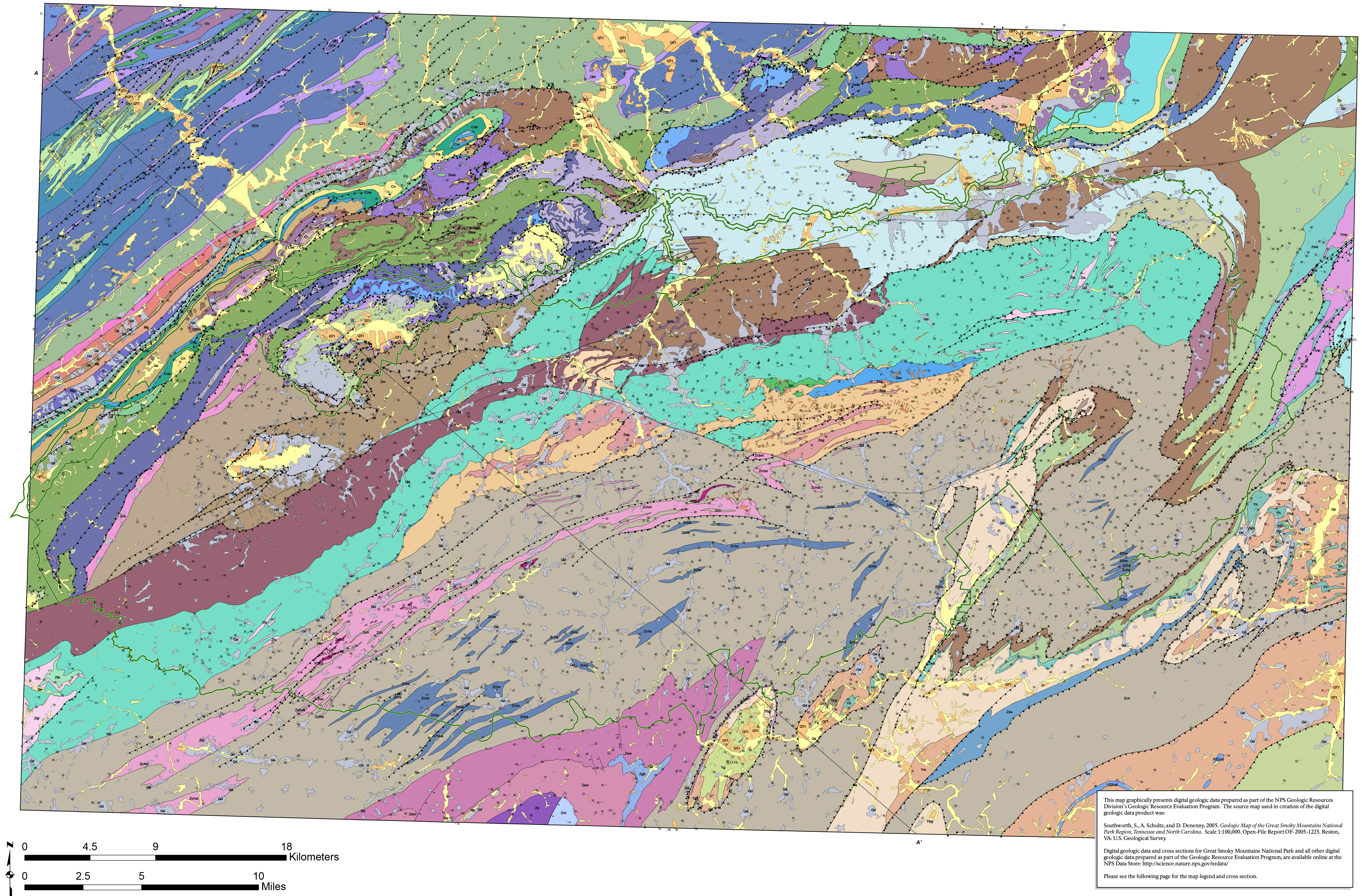
Geologic map of Great Smoky Mountains National Park showing the distribution of Ocoee Supergroup units and adjacent formations.

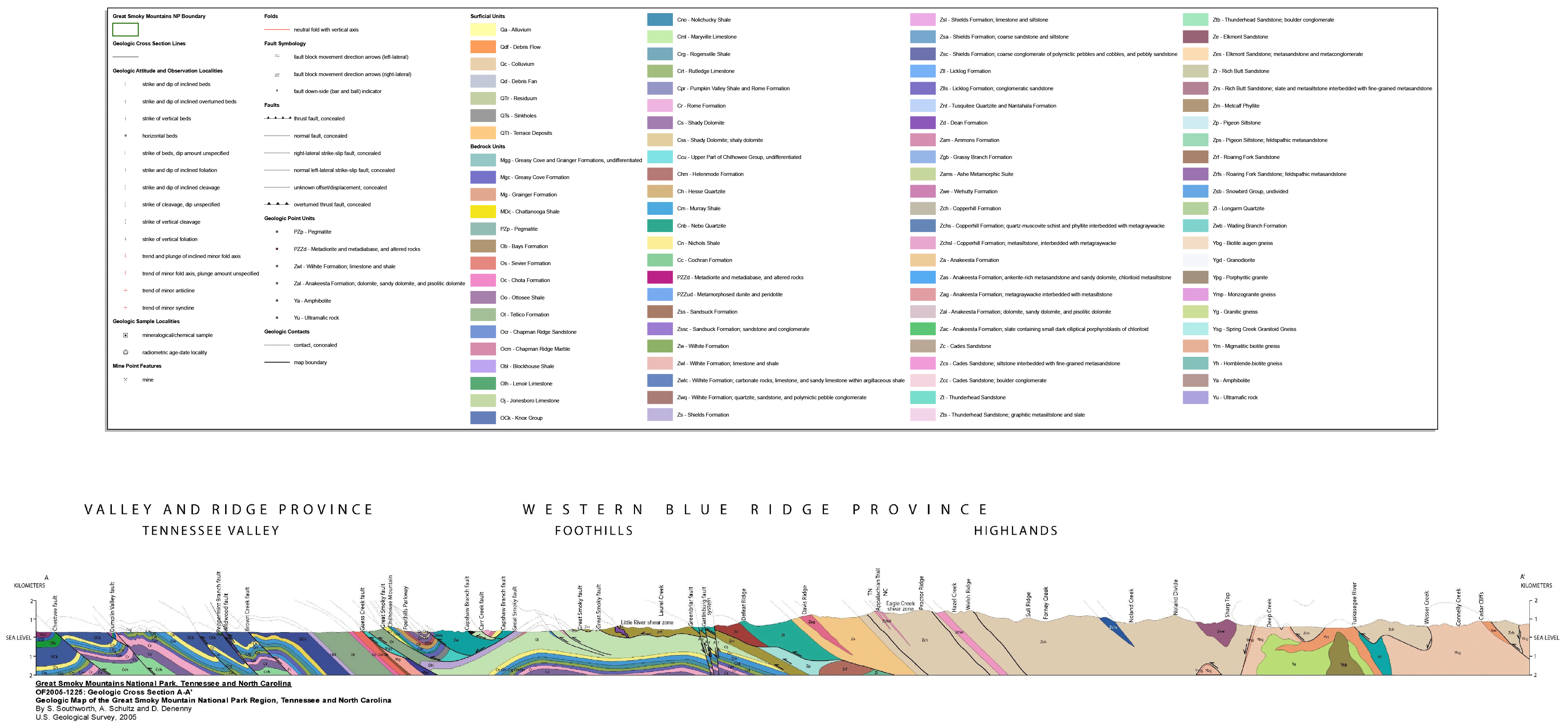
Legend and cross section for the geologic map.

In the Great Smoky Mountains region, the Ocoee Supergroup is conventionally subdivided, in ascending order, into the Snowbird, Great Smoky, and Walden Creek Groups, though fault repetition and deformation locally obscure their original stratigraphic relationships.

== Name and definition ==
The name Ocoee is derived from exposures along the narrows of the Ocoee River in Tennessee, and is used by the U.S. Geological Survey to refer to the unit as the Ocoee Supergroup in Georgia, North Carolina, and Tennessee.

== Geographic distribution and exposure ==
Ocoee Supergroup rocks are widely exposed in the Blue Ridge of eastern Tennessee and western North Carolina, including large areas within the Great Smoky Mountains National Park. The Great Smoky Group forms much of the crest of the Great Smoky Mountains within the park area.

== Stratigraphy ==
=== Subdivision in the Great Smoky Mountains region ===
In and near Great Smoky Mountains National Park, the Ocoee Supergroup is commonly described as comprising three principal groups (in ascending order): Snowbird, Great Smoky, and Walden Creek.

==== Snowbird Group ====
The Snowbird Group is reported as more than ~3,900 m (13,000 ft) thick in the park region and consists mostly of sandstone with interbedded finer-grained sandstone, siltstone, and argillaceous rocks that become increasingly abundant westward. It is commonly divided (in ascending order) into the Wading Branch Formation, Longarm Quartzite, Roaring Fork Sandstone, and Pigeon Siltstone; toward the west, the Metcalf Phyllite comprises an increasing proportion of the group.

==== Great Smoky Group ====
The Great Smoky Group is reported as more than ~7,600 m (25,000 ft) thick in the park region and is commonly divided (in ascending order) into the Elkmont Sandstone, Thunderhead Sandstone, and Anakeesta Formation. The Anakeesta includes dark, silty and argillaceous rocks metamorphosed to slate, phyllite, and schist; oxidation of pyrite and other iron sulfides commonly produces a characteristic rusty weathering color, and its fissile layers help form steep ridges and prominent outcrops (for example, Chimney Tops and Charlies Bunion).

Regional mapping subdivides parts of the Great Smoky Group into formations that are not always distinguished in simplified summaries. One such unit is the Copperhill Formation, which is characterized by massive, coarse-grained metagraywacke and metaconglomerate, locally interbedded with sulfidic, quartz–garnet–muscovite phyllite and schist. The same mapping notes that graphitic and sulfidic slaty rocks occur in the lower part of the Copperhill Formation, with more muscovite-rich schist higher in the section. More broadly, classic work on the Ocoee succession formalized three major subdivisions—Snowbird, Great Smoky, and Walden Creek—and emphasized complex intertonguing relationships among formations and structural disruption by major thrust faults.

==== Walden Creek Group ====
In the park region, the Walden Creek Group is described as a varied assemblage of argillaceous and silty rocks mixed with quartz-pebble conglomerate, locally ~2,400 m (8,000 ft) thick, and containing prominent quartzite, limestone, and dolomite. It is commonly subdivided (in ascending order) into the Licklog Formation, Shields Formation, Wilhite Formation, and Sandsuck Formation.

=== Stratigraphic contacts and regional context ===
In much of the Great Smoky Mountains region, Ocoee rocks are structurally repeated and juxtaposed by faults, complicating the interpretation of original superposition. Where preserved, uppermost Ocoee strata are closely associated with the latest Neoproterozoic–early Cambrian transition; regional mapping describes the Cochran Formation as transitional between the underlying Sandsuck Formation (Walden Creek Group) and the basal part of the Shady Dolomite/Chilhowee succession in the western Great Smoky Mountains foothills.

=== Regional nomenclature ===
Across the southern Appalachians, mapped subunits of the Ocoee Supergroup include the Snowbird, Great Smoky, and Walden Creek Groups (Georgia, North Carolina, Tennessee), as well as the Pine Mountain Group in Georgia.

== Depositional setting ==
The Ocoee Supergroup is widely interpreted as having been deposited in a long-lived basin (“Ocoee basin”) that developed along the southeastern margin of Laurentia during Neoproterozoic rifting and early passive-margin evolution. Deposits are commonly described as thick clastic successions built by repeated submarine landslides and turbidity flows in multiple pulses, ultimately reaching very large thicknesses (locally cited as up to ~15 km).

== Metamorphism and deformation ==
Ocoee rocks in the Great Smoky Mountains region were later deformed by numerous faults that can repeat stratigraphic sections (for example, the Greenbrier fault), and they are structurally separated from unmetamorphosed Paleozoic rocks of the adjacent Valley and Ridge province by the Great Smoky thrust fault system.

The Great Smoky thrust is part of the broader Blue Ridge–Piedmont fault system and is associated with very large northwest-directed displacement; in the Great Smoky Mountains foothills, lower-grade metamorphism preserves many preexisting structures that help constrain Taconic and Alleghanian deformation histories.

== Age and controversies ==
Determining the age of the Ocoee Supergroup has been historically difficult because parts of the succession were long considered fossil-poor and are strongly deformed. The unit has commonly been assigned a late Precambrian (Neoproterozoic) age based on its position above Grenville-age basement rocks and below the lowermost Cambrian strata.

Fossil reports in the Wilhite Formation (Walden Creek Group) have been cited as evidence for a younger (Paleozoic) age for at least part of the upper succession. More recent work synthesizing geologic mapping, paleontology, and geochemistry has argued that mid-Paleozoic fossil-bearing rocks occur as structurally isolated thrust-sheet “horses” within a demonstrably Neoproterozoic–Cambrian stratigraphic framework, and that Walden Creek Group rocks on either side are more consistent with a Late Neoproterozoic depositional age of approximately 550–545 Ma.

== Environmental and geomorphic significance ==
Within Great Smoky Mountains National Park, differences among Ocoee rock types help shape ridge-and-valley morphology as well as prominent outcrops. In particular, sulfide-bearing layers (notably within the Anakeesta Formation) can produce rusty weathering from oxidation and may contribute to locally acidic runoff conditions when combined with other environmental stressors.

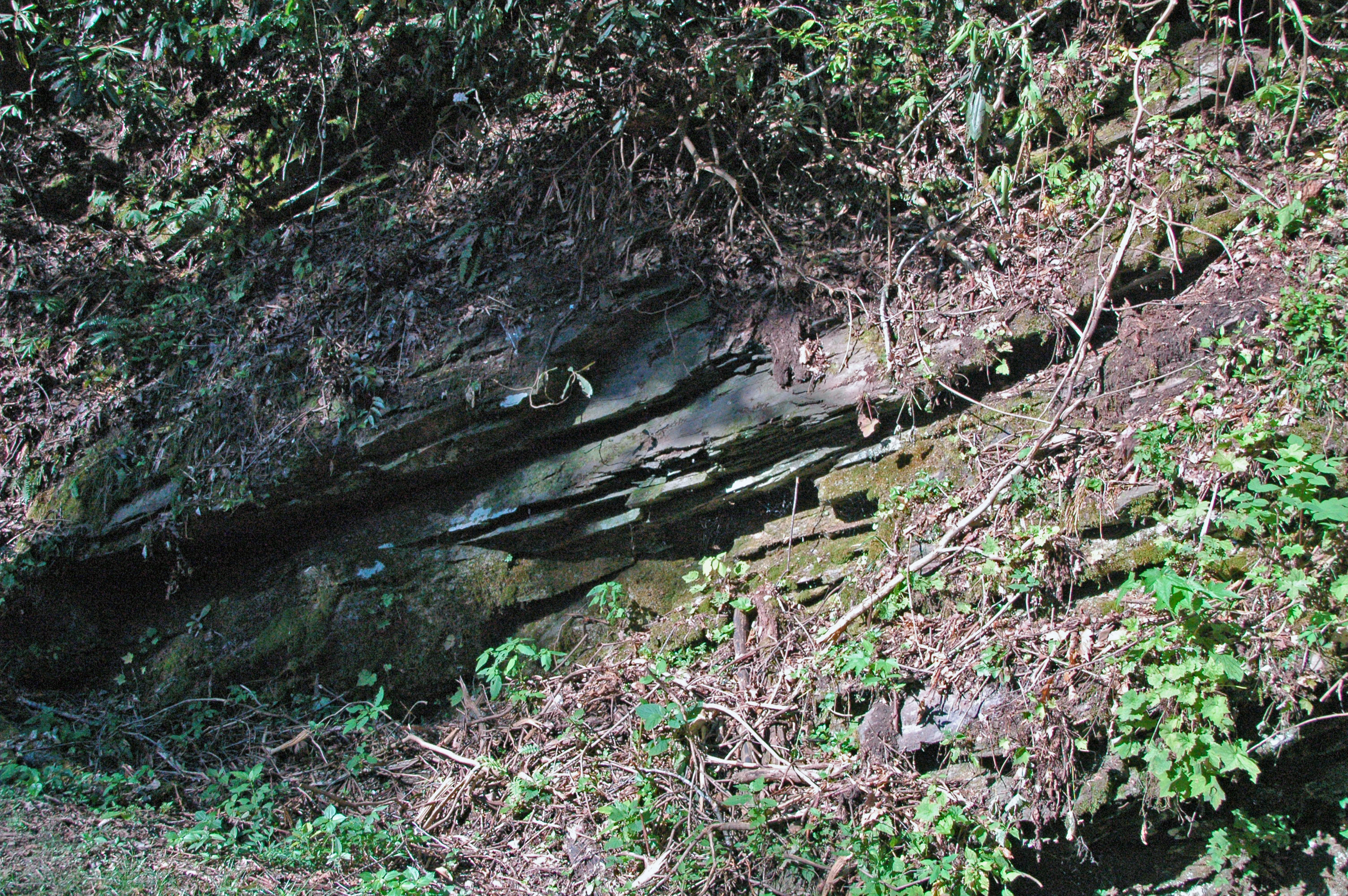
Outcrop of the Roaring Fork Sandstone (Snowbird Group), part of the Ocoee Supergroup.

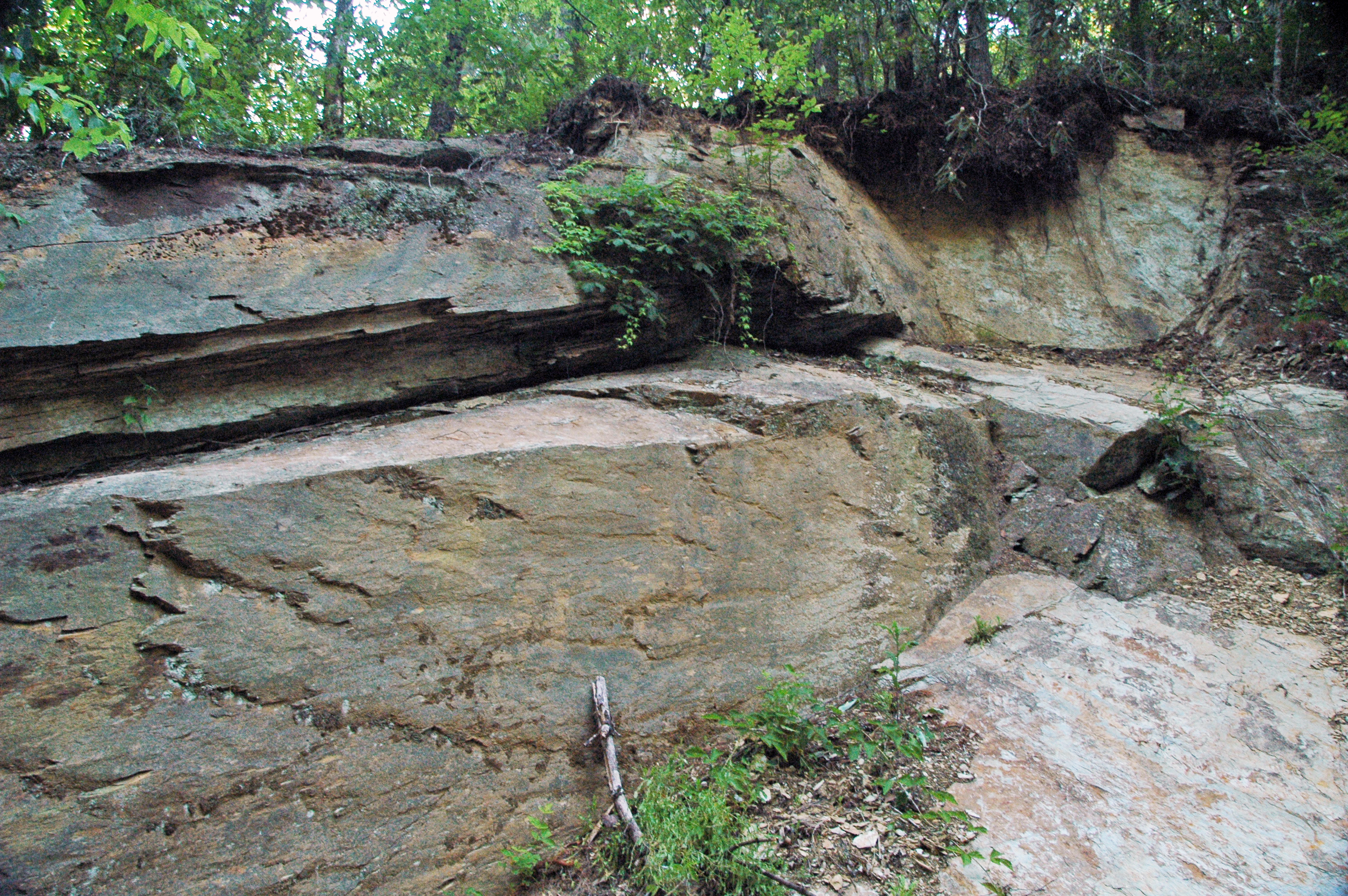
Metcalf Phyllite (Snowbird Group), metamorphosed mudrocks within the Ocoee Supergroup.

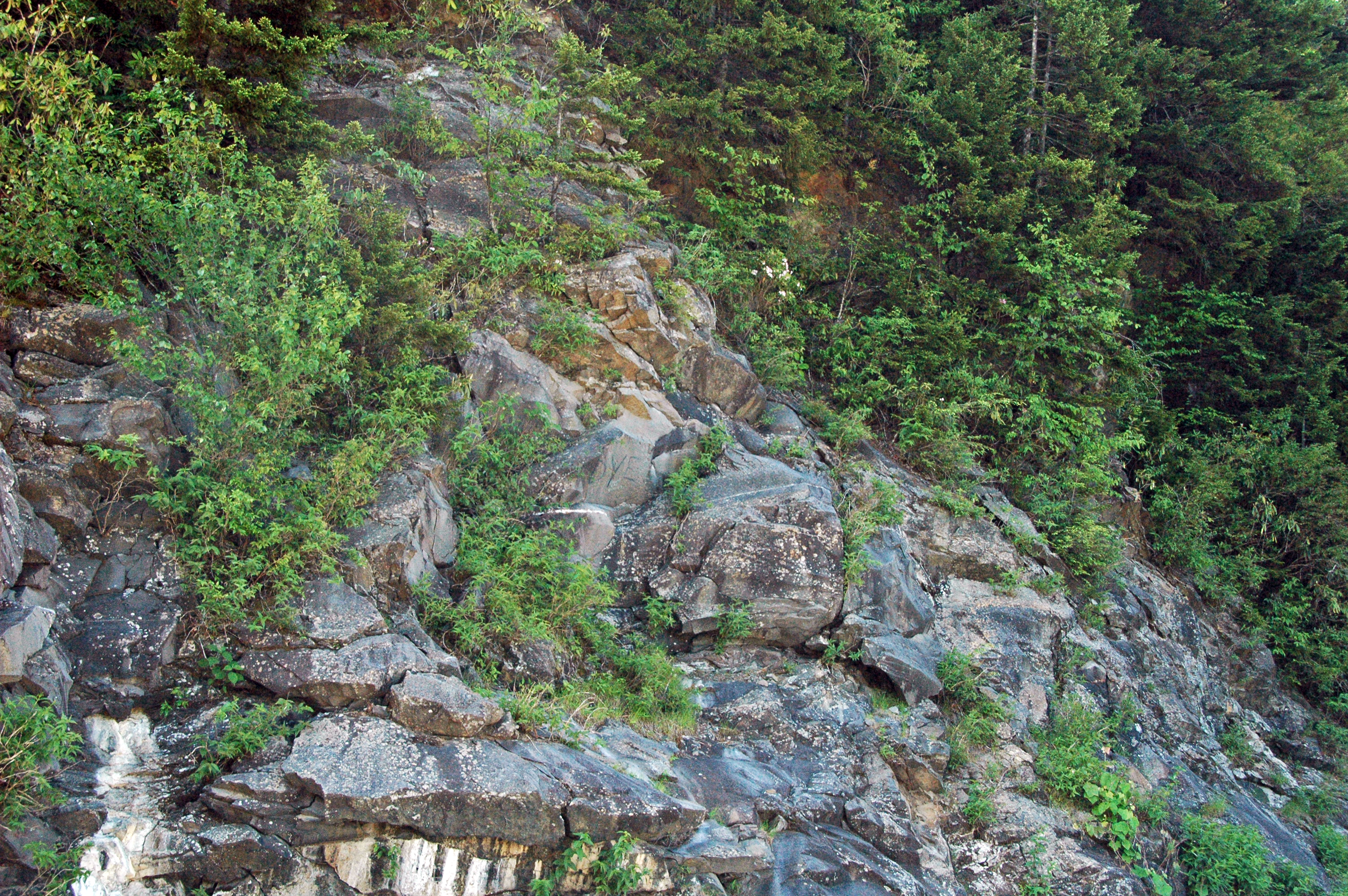
Anakeesta Formation exposure (Ocoee Supergroup) in Great Smoky Mountains National Park.

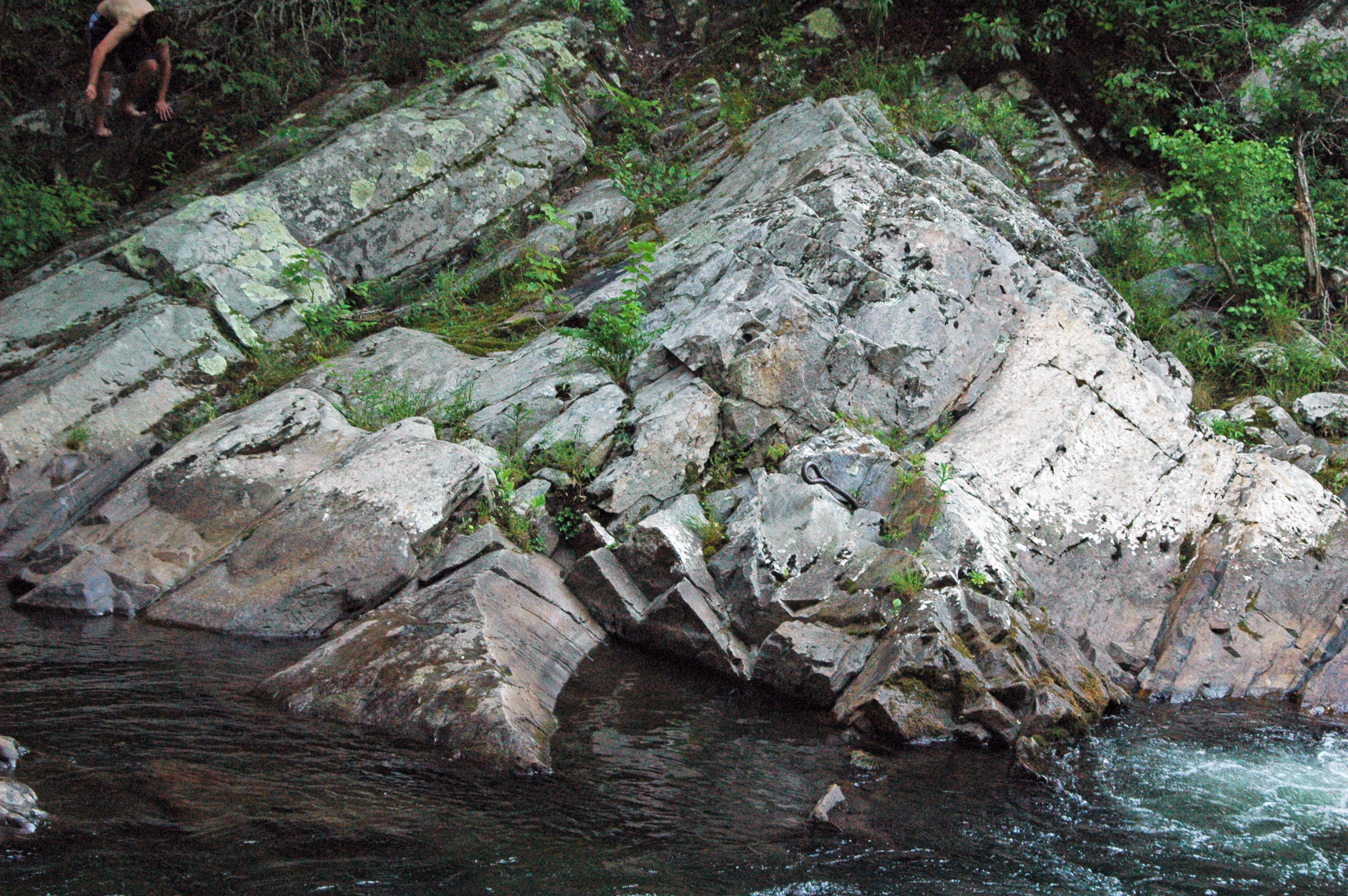
Thunderhead Sandstone (Great Smoky Group), a sandstone-dominated unit within the Ocoee Supergroup.

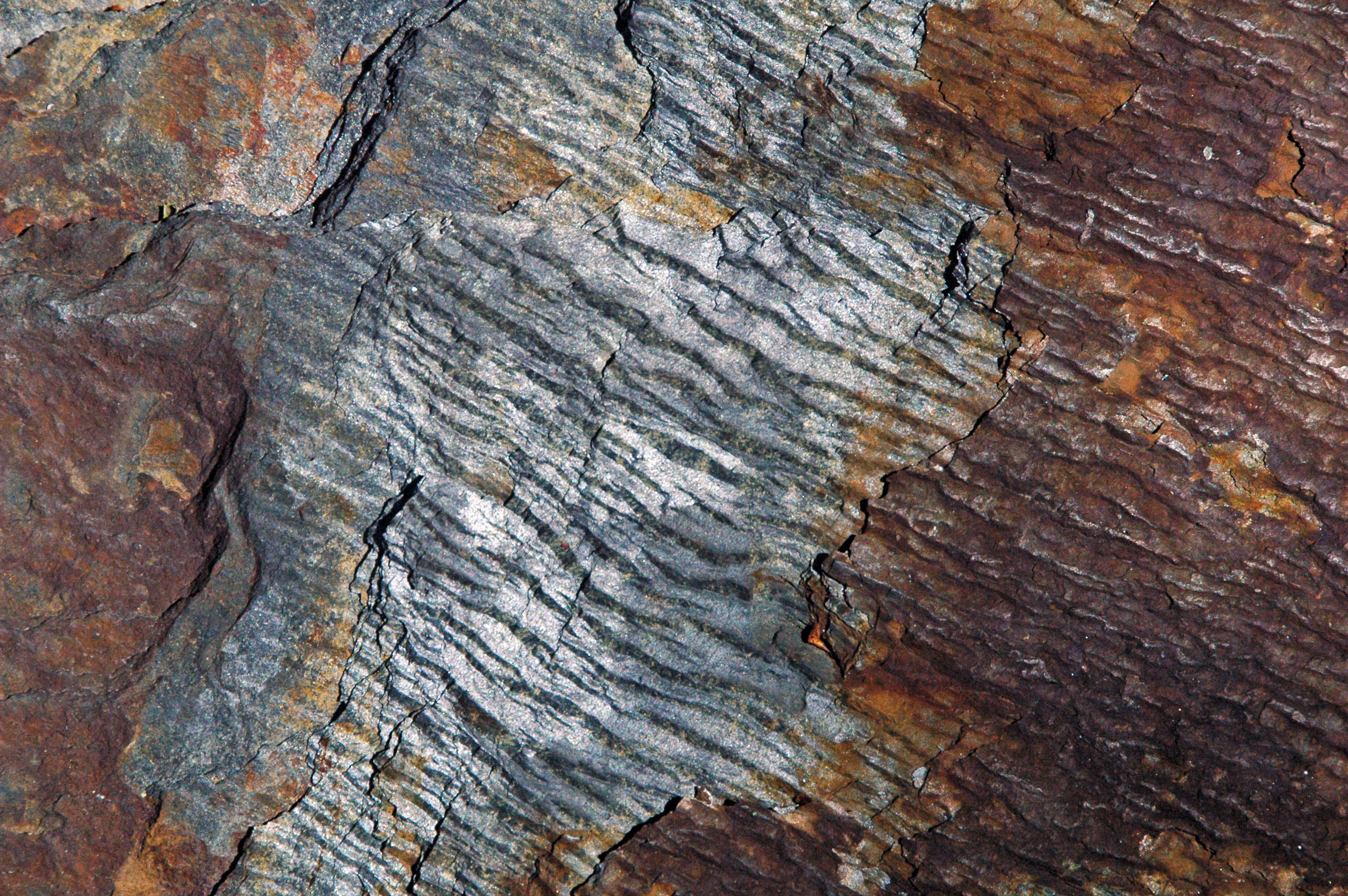
Phyllitic texture in the Anakeesta Formation (Ocoee Supergroup).

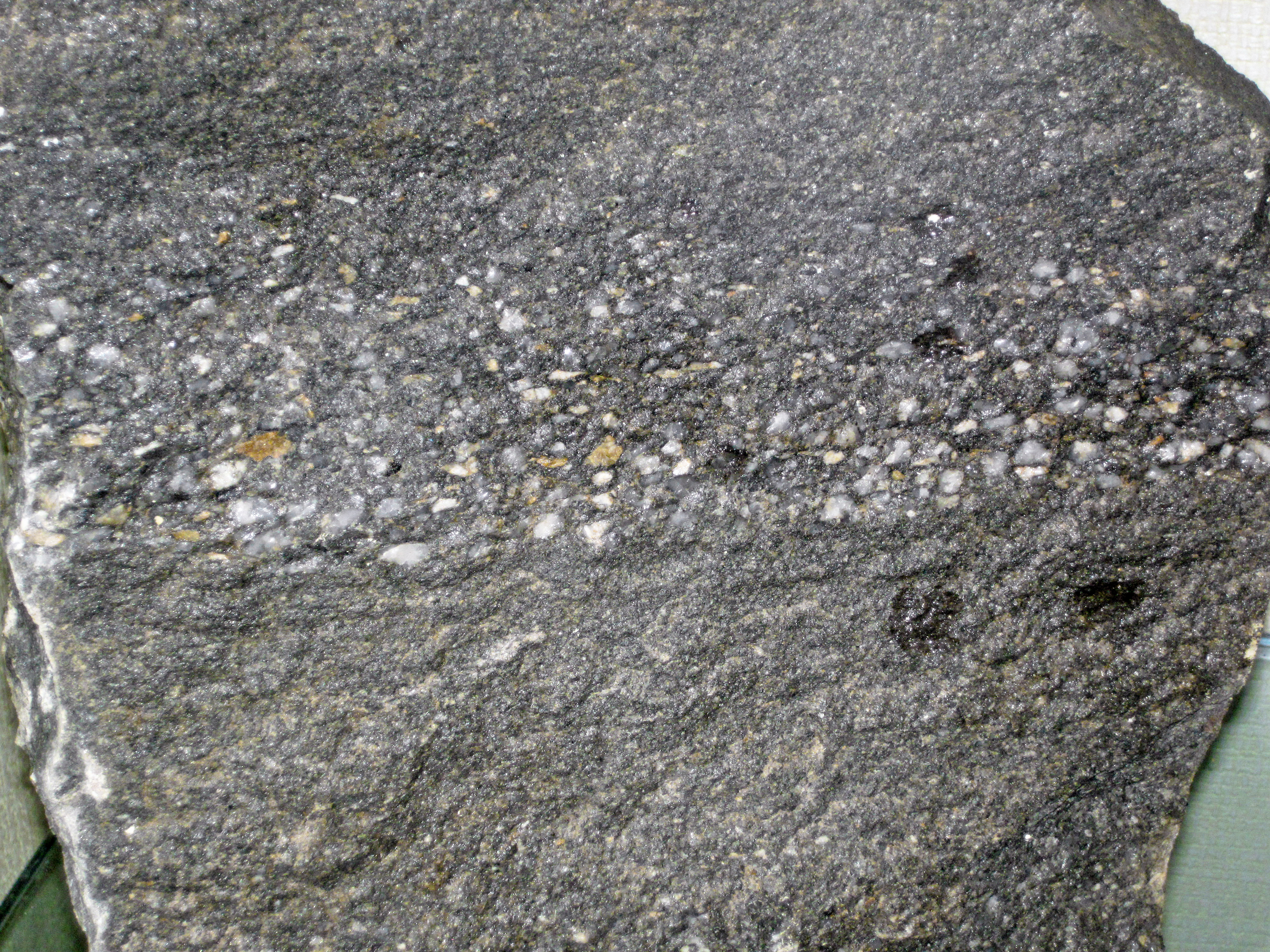
Graded bedding in the Wilhite Formation (Walden Creek Group), consistent with deposition by sediment-gravity flows.

== See also ==
- Great Smoky Mountains
- Oconaluftee (Great Smoky Mountains)
- Great Smoky Mountains National Park
- Ocoee River
- Oconaluftee River
- Blue Ridge Mountains
- Appalachian Mountains
- Walden Creek Group
- Anakeesta Formation
- Valley and Ridge
- Laurentia
