= Andrews Bald =

Mountain in North Carolina, United States

Coordinates: 35.54167°N 83.49333°W

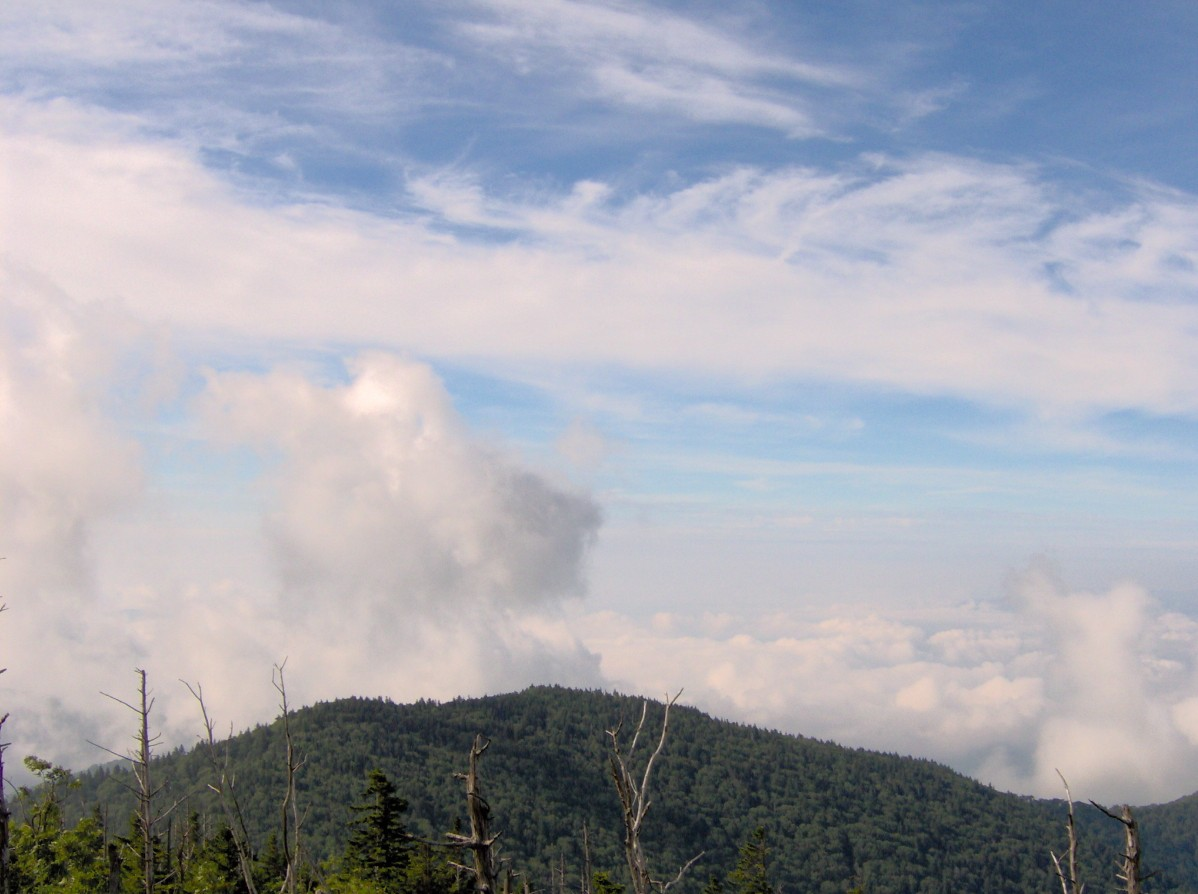
Andrews Bald, looking south from Kuwohi

Andrews Bald is a mountain in the Great Smoky Mountains, located in the southeastern United States. It has an elevation of 5,920 feet (1,800 m) above sea level, making it the highest grassy bald in the Great Smoky Mountains National Park. The mountain is one of two grassy balds maintained in the range by the National Park Service. The other is Gregory Bald, in the western Smokies.

Andrews Bald is a double peak situated along Forney Ridge, just south of Kuwohi. Andrews Bald is the 62nd-highest mountain in North Carolina and is located entirely within Swain County.

Unlike Gregory Bald, the bald area of Andrews does not cover the summit but spreads out around the south slope. How and why grassy balds form is a mystery. While cattle grazing maintained the balds throughout the 19th-century, the forest slowly started reclaiming them after the formation of the national park in the 1930s. In the early 1980s, the park service polled park visitors regarding the state of the grassy balds, and the response was overwhelmingly in favor of maintaining the balds atop Gregory and Andrews.

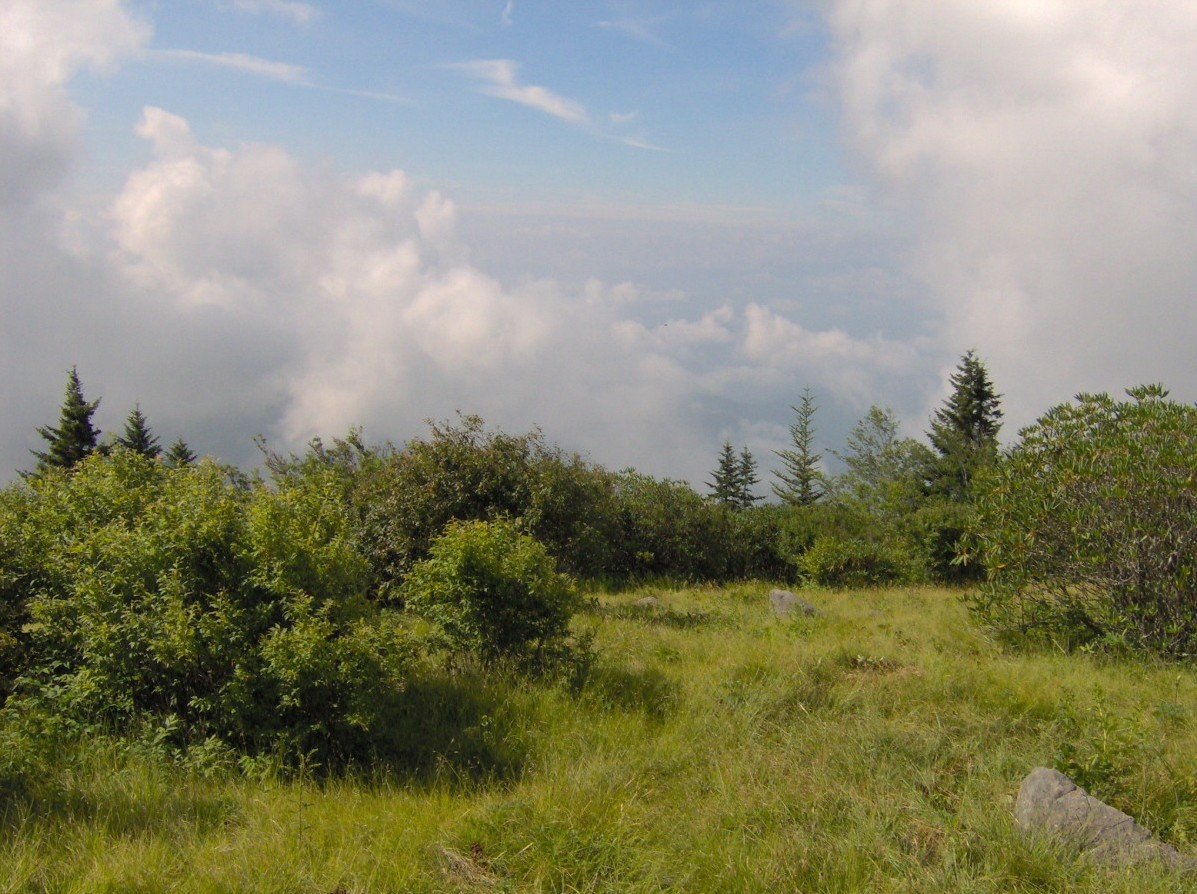
The bald area atop Andrews Bald

Andrews Bald is probably named after Andres Thompson, an early settler who used the mountain for hunting. A cabin once stood on the southwest slope, near the tip of the present bald area. Herders' shacks were not uncommon in the high-elevation grazing areas of southern Appalachia during the late 19th and early 20th centuries, so the cabin may have been a seasonal residence.

The Forney Ridge Trail crosses Andrews Bald, passing to within a few feet of the summit, and traverses the entire bald area en route to Springhouse Branch. The trail intersects the Appalachian Trail on the slopes of Kuwohi and can be accessed from the Forney Ridge parking lot. The bald area is just under two miles (3 km) from the parking lot.
