= Kuwohi =

Mountain, highest point in Tennessee, United States

Kuwohi (Cherokee)
- Clingmans Dome
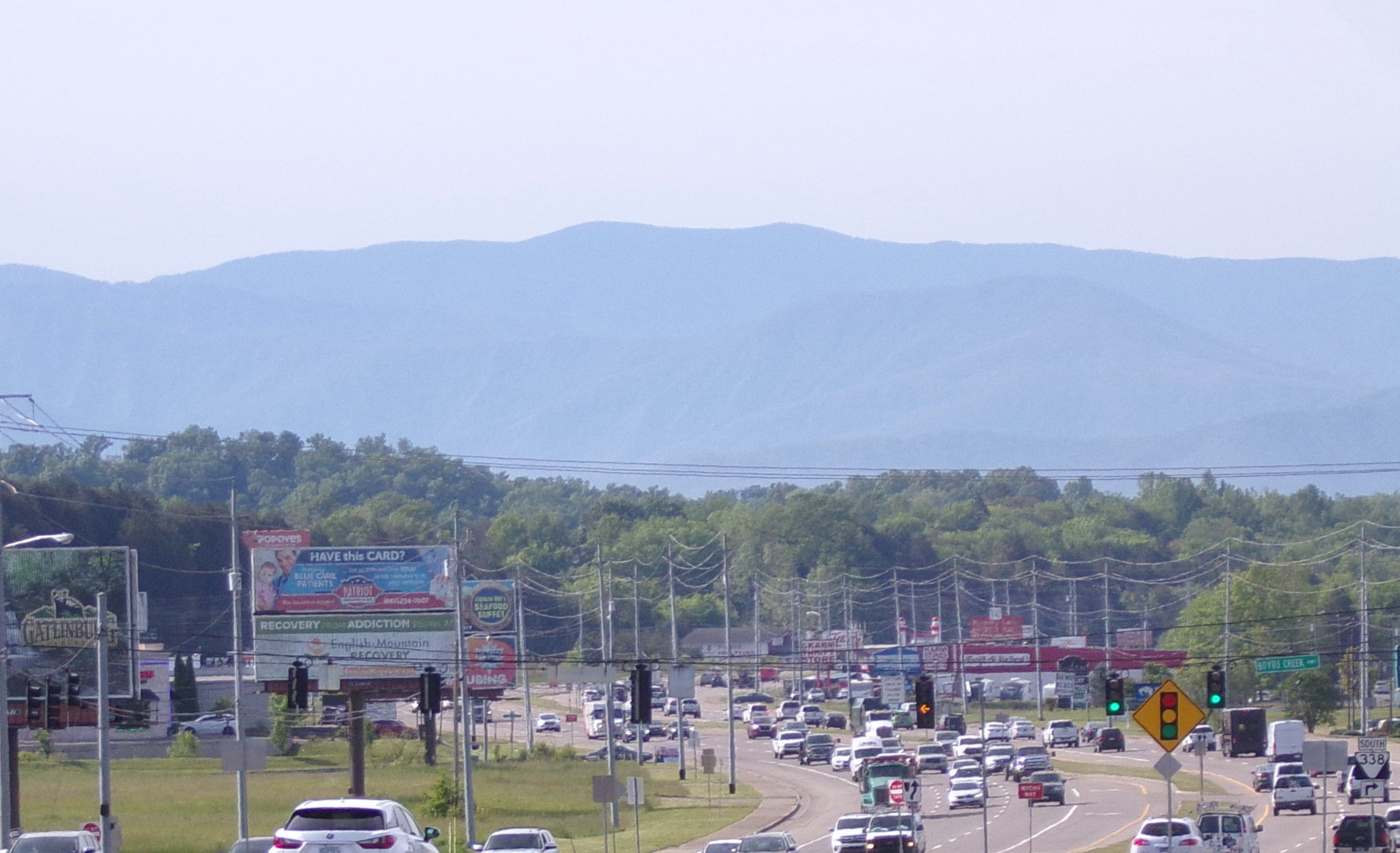
- Kuwohi as seen from Sevierville, Tennessee

Highest point
- Elevation: 6,643 ft (2,025 m)
- Prominence: 4,503 ft (1,373 m)
- Listing: U.S. state high point 17th; Great Smoky Mountains high point
- Coordinates: 35°33′46″N 83°29′55″W

Geography
- Location within Tennessee Location within the United States
- Location: Great Smoky Mountains National Park; Sevier County, Tennessee, U.S.; Swain County, North Carolina, U.S.
- Parent range: Great Smoky Mountains
- Topo map: USGS Clingmans Dome

Climbing
- Easiest route: Short paved trail hike

Kuwohi (Cherokee: ᎫᏬᎯ), also known as Clingmans Dome (its former official name), is a mountain in the Great Smoky Mountains of Tennessee and North Carolina in the Southeastern United States.

At an elevation of 6,643 feet (2,025 m), it is the highest mountain in the Great Smoky Mountains National Park, the highest point in the state of Tennessee, and the highest point along the 2,192-mile (3,528 km) Appalachian Trail. It is also the third highest point in eastern mainland North America, after Mount Mitchell (6,684 feet or 2,037 meters) and Mount Craig (6,647 feet or 2,026 meters).

== Description ==
Kuwohi has two subpeaks: 6,560-foot (2,000 m) Mount Buckley to the west; and 6,400-foot (1,950 m) Mount Love to the east. The headwaters of several substantial streams are located on the slopes of Kuwohi, including Little River on the north slope, and Forney Creek and Noland Creek, both of which are tributaries of the Tuckasegee River, on the south slope. The mountain is located entirely within the watershed of the Tennessee River.

Kuwohi is protected as part of the Great Smoky Mountains National Park. A paved road connects it to U.S. Highway 441 at Newfound Gap 6.7 miles (10.8 km) away.

A 45-foot (14 m) tall concrete observation tower at the summit, built in 1959 and listed on the National Register of Historic Places, offers a panoramic view of the mountains. An air quality monitoring station, operated by the Environmental Protection Agency, is the second highest in eastern North America.

The Southern Appalachian spruce–fir forest that covers Kuwohi occurs only at the highest elevations in the Southeastern United States and has more in common with forests at northern latitudes than with the forests in the adjacent valleys. Kuwohi stands prominently above the surrounding terrain, rising nearly 5,000 feet (1,500 m) from base to summit. The forest on and around Kuwohi has experienced a large die-off of Fraser fir caused by non-native insect balsam woolly adelgid.

=== Observation tower ===
- Clingmans Dome Observation Tower
- U.S. National Register of Historic Places
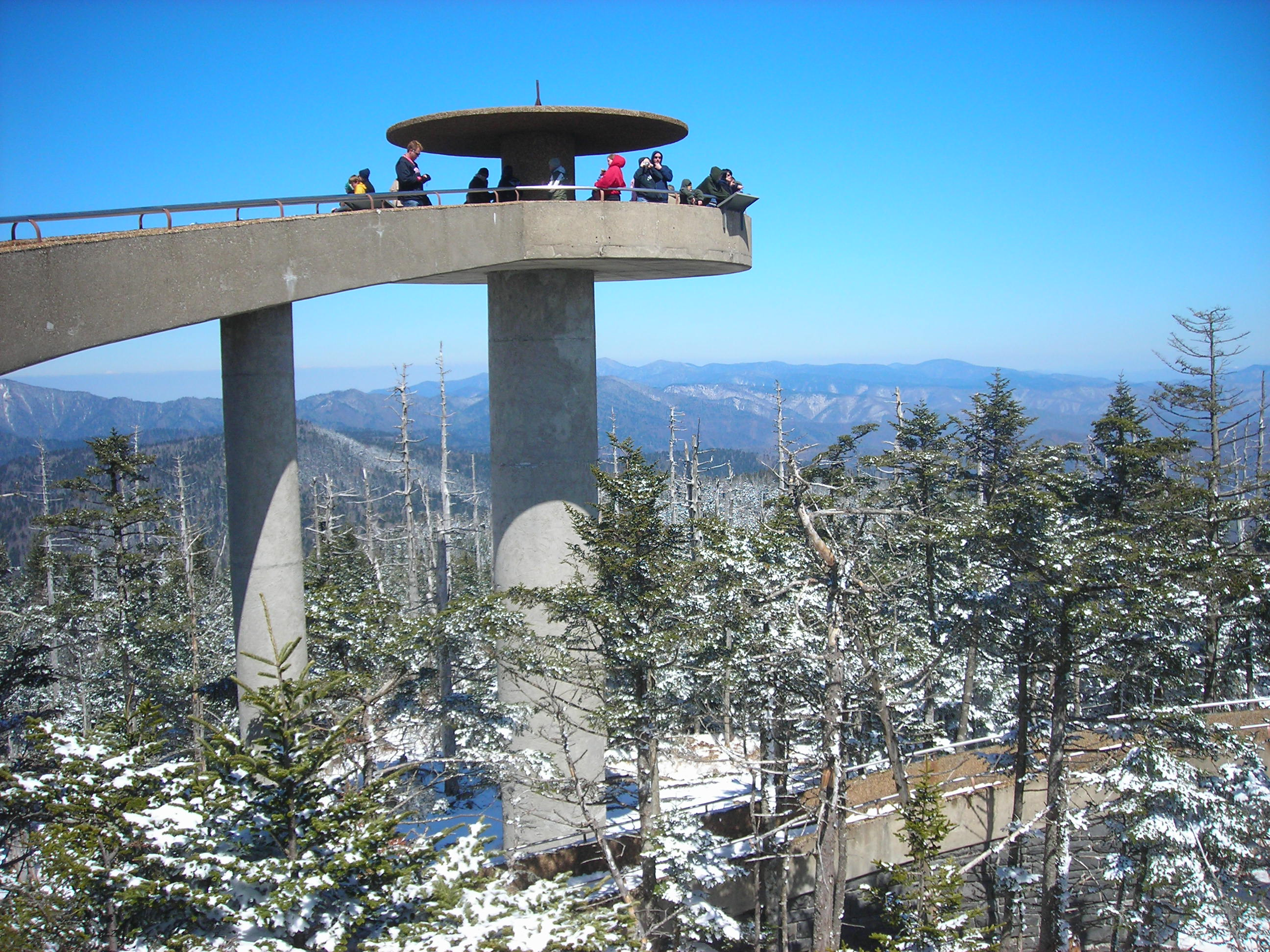
- Area: 1.4 acres (0.57 ha)
- Built: 1959
- Architects: Bebb and Olson
- Architectural style: Modern
- NRHP reference No.: 12000515
- Added to NRHP: 2012-08-15

Built in 1959, the observation tower features a circular observation platform accessed by a spiral ramp. The ramp is 375 feet (114 m) in length, and rises at a 12 percent grade, in sync with the Clingmans Dome Trail. The platform, 28 feet (8.5 m) in diameter, allows spectators a 360-degree panorama of the surrounding terrain. Cantilevered signs point out the various peaks, ridges, cities, and other features visible in the distance. Depending on the haze, visibility ranges from 20 miles (32 km) on hazy days to 100 miles (160 km) on very clear days.

The tower was one of nine observation towers constructed as part of the Mission 66 program (1955–1966), an effort by the National Park Service to upgrade its facilities to accommodate an influx of visitors to national parks during the post-World War II era. Designed by Hubert Bebb of the Gatlinburg-based architecture firm Bebb and Olson, the tower's modern design, especially the use of concrete as the primary building material, marked a departure from previous park structures, which favored more rustic elements. Although some criticized the Clingmans Dome tower as too "urban", two other park service observation towers—the nearby Look Rock tower along Foothills Parkway and the Shark Valley tower at Everglades National Park—were built using similar designs.

Bebb's original design consisted of a massive stone tower topped by a circular platform and fire observation cab, accessed by a concrete ramp. Fred Arnold, head of the park service's Forest and Wildlife Protection branch, rejected the inclusion of the fire observation cab, arguing that while Kuwohi was the highest point in the park, it was not particularly useful for fire detection purposes. Park service director Conrad Wirth objected to the use of a ramp, favoring instead a spiral staircase. After John B. Cabot, head of the park service's Eastern Office of Design and Construction, convinced him of the ramp's usefulness, Wirth decided the stone tower would not be necessary, stating a single central support column would suffice.

The tower was built by the Waynesville, North Carolina construction firm of W.C. Norris at a cost of US$57,000 (equivalent to $640,000 in 2025). Ground was broken in December 1958. After several weather delays and a great deal of controversy over the aesthetics of the design, the tower was completed on October 23, 1959.

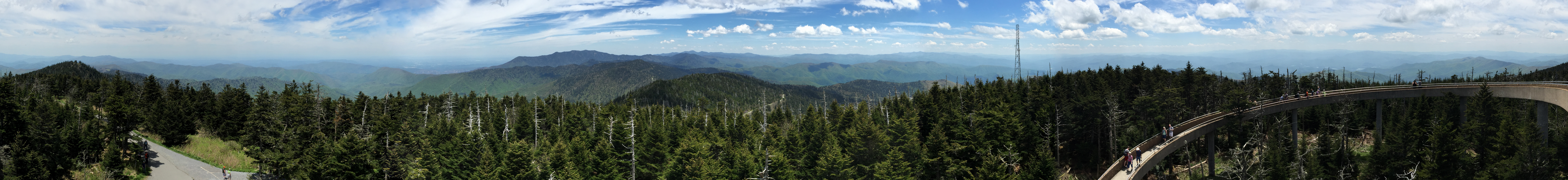
360-degree panoramic from the tower. Mount Le Conte can be seen center-left.

=== Access ===
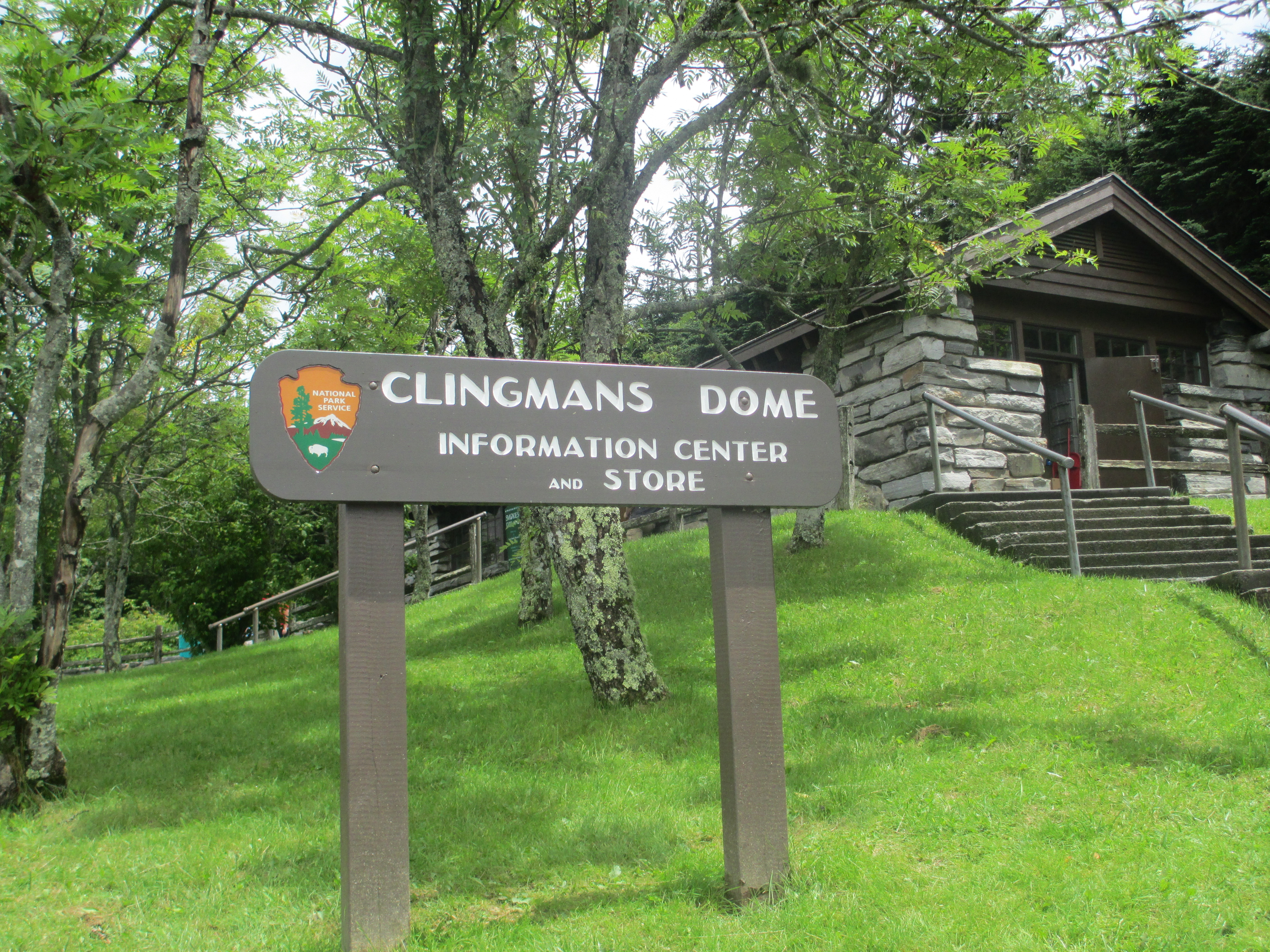
Information Center.

Kuwohi is the most accessible mountain top in the Great Smoky Mountains National Park. The 7-mile (11 km) Clingmans Dome Road, which is open annually from April 1 through November 30, begins just past Newfound Gap and leads up the mountain to the Forney Ridge Parking Area, 330 feet (100 m) below the summit. A 1/2-mile (800 m) paved trail leads from the parking lot to the observation tower. The short, steep trail provides a small visitor information center and park store staffed by Smokies Life, the park's non-profit. The trail offers a glimpse of the often hostile environment of highland Appalachia, passing through the spruce-fir forest and its accompanying blowdowns and dead Fraser Firs.

The Appalachian Trail (A.T.) crosses Kuwohi, passing immediately north of the observation tower. A 7.5-mile (12.1 km) leg of the trail connects the mountain with Newfound Gap and provides the only access to the mountain in winter months. The nearest A.T. backcountry shelters are the Double Spring Gap Shelter, which is 2.6 miles (4.2 km) to the west near the Goshen Prong junction, and the Mount Collins shelter, which is 4 miles (6.4 km) to the east near the A.T.'s junction with the Sugarland Mountain Trail. Kuwohi is the upper terminus for several additional hiking trails, including the Forney Ridge Trail (to Andrews Bald) and the Forney Creek Trail (to the Benton MacKaye Trail on the shores of Fontana Lake).

The western terminus of the Mountains-to-Sea Trail, which connects the Smokies to the Outer Banks of North Carolina, is located atop Kuwohi. It follows the Appalachian Trail for 3.8 miles (6.1 km) to the east, where it then begins to descend toward the Blue Ridge Parkway, via the Fork Ridge Trail.

== History ==
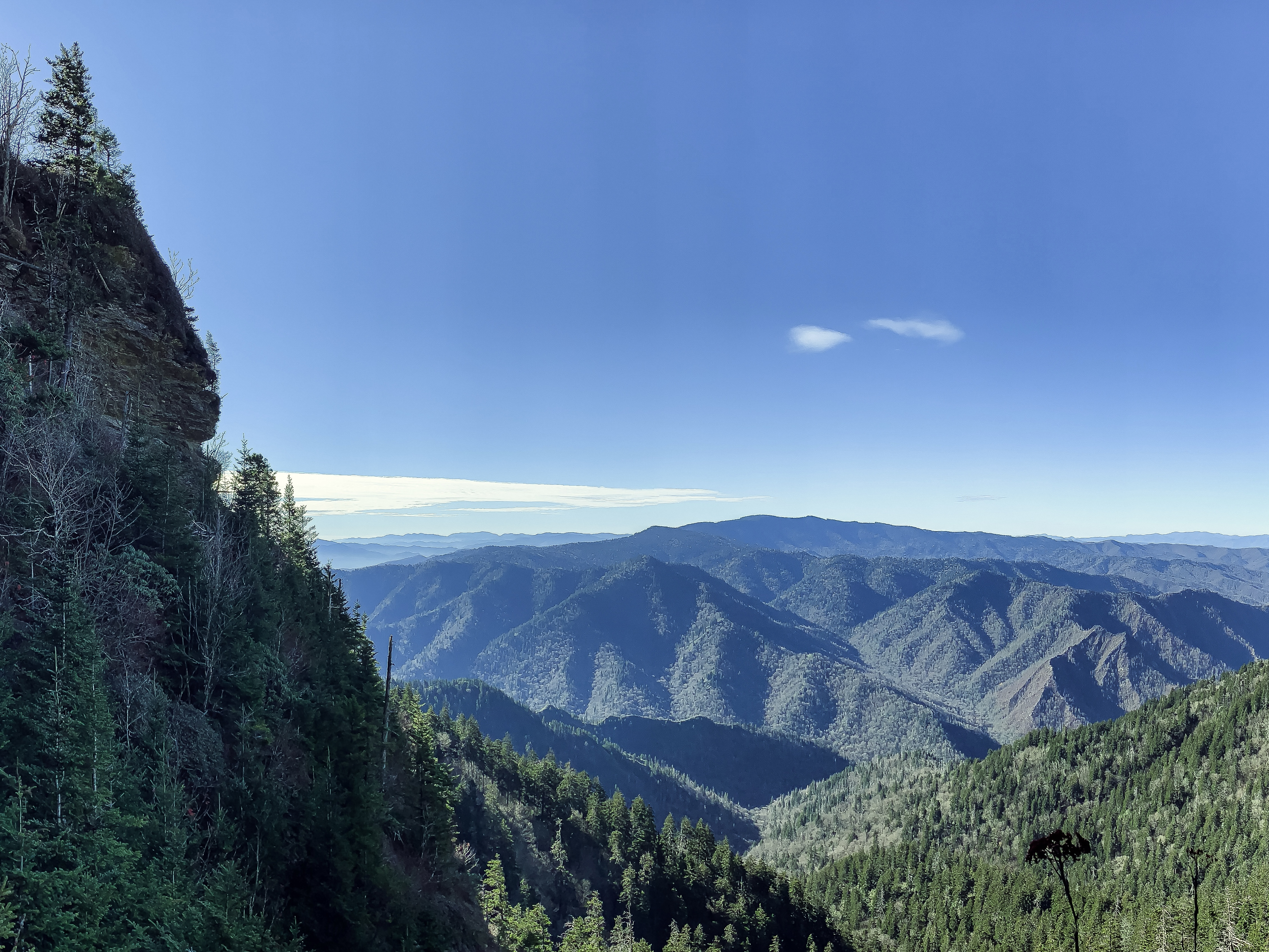
Viewpoint along the Alum Cave Trail ascending towards Mount Le Conte

The Cherokee name for the mountain is Kuwahi (ᎫᏩᎯ) or Kuwohi (ᎫᏬᎯ), translating to 'mulberry place'. According to a Cherokee myth recorded by ethnologist James Mooney in the late 19th century, the mountain was the home of the White Bear, the great chief of all bears, and the location of one of the bears' council houses. The enchanted lake of Ataga'hi ("Gall Place"), the waters of which could cure wounded bears, was believed by the Cherokee to be located somewhere between Kuwohi and the headwaters of the Oconaluftee River to the east.

In 1789, an act passed by the North Carolina legislature ceded what is now Tennessee to the federal government. This act fixed a portion of the boundary between the two along the crest of the "Great Iron or Smoky Mountains," which would have included the mountain later known as Clingmans Dome. The mountain was dubbed "Smoky Dome" by American settlers moving in from other areas.

In 1859, the mountain was renamed to "Clingmans Dome" by geographer Arnold Guyot for compatriot Thomas L. Clingman, who extensively explored, measured, and promoted the area in the 1850s, and who would go on to become a Confederate general of the American Civil War. Guyot named the mountain for Clingman because of an argument between Clingman and a professor at the University of North Carolina, Elisha Mitchell, over which mountain was actually the highest in the region. Mitchell contended that a peak by the name of Black Dome (now known as Mount Mitchell) was the highest, while Clingman asserted that Smoky Dome was the true highest peak. Clingman had previously measured Smoky Dome’s elevation during a joint expedition in 1858 using triangulation and barometers, becoming the first person to accurately measure the elevation of the mountain top, despite never stepping foot on the mountain. Guyot determined that Black Dome was 39 feet (12 m) higher than Smoky Dome.

In the early morning hours of June 12, 1946, a Boeing B-29 Superfortress crashed near the summit of Kuwohi, killing all twelve aboard.

In June 2022, Lavita Hill and Mary "Missy" Crowe, both members of the Eastern Band of Cherokee Indians, drafted legislation for the Tribe to support changing the name of Clingmans Dome to Kuwahi ('mulberry place')—the original name given to the area by Cherokees. The resolution describes the area, "Kuwahi or 'mulberry place', is the highest point in our area and has significance to us as Cherokees as it was visited by medicine people who prayed and sought guidance from the Creator regarding important matters facing our people, and then returned to our towns to give guidance and advice." The Tribal Council of the Eastern Band of Cherokee Indians passed the legislation, submitted by Hill and Crowe, during its regular session on July 14, 2022, thus lending the Tribe's support for the name change effort. The change was presented as an opportunity "to talk about the language" and remind people that "this was Cherokee homeland."

The official process started with the filing of an application for a name change through the United States Board on Geographic Names (BGN). On August 2, 2022, the Buncombe County Board of Commissioners voted unanimously to support the name change, after consultation with the Eastern Band of Cherokee Indians. The council of the tribe voted in early 2024 to authorize the submission of an application to BGN. The National Park Service "strongly supported" this name change. It was ultimately approved, with the official press release of the name change to Kuwohi, which was effective immediately, being released on September 18, 2024.

== Geology ==
Kuwohi is part of a geological formation known as the Copperhill Formation. It consists predominately of massive, coarse-grained metagreywacke and metaconglomerate. The lower northern flanks of Kuwohi are underlain by thick layers of sulfidic, quartz-garnet-muscovite phyllite and schist, which occur within the metagraywackes and metaconglomerates. Adjacent to and south of its summit, thin, southward-dipping, and discontinuous beds of garnetiferous (locally graphitic and sulfidic) metasiltstone occur within the Copperhill Formation.

The Copperhill Formation is part of the greater Ocoee Supergroup, a body of clastic metasedimentary rocks formed 560 million years ago. They unconformably lie upon Precambrian granitic and gneissic rocks. The sediments that originally comprised the Ocoee Supergroup accumulated in a string of narrow, deep-water basins that stretched along the entire southern-central Appalachian margin from Tennessee, North Carolina, to Georgia. These basins were rift basins formed by the rifting of Rodinia.

The initial metamorphism of the Ocoee Supergroup occurred about 400 million years ago as the result of Ordovician-Silurian tectonism during the Taconic orogeny. Later, Devonian-Mississippian metamorphism of these strata occurred during the Acadian orogeny and additional Pennsylvanian to Permian alteration by retrograde metamorphism and deformation occurred during the Alleghanian orogeny. During the latest part of this orogeny, this segment of the Appalachian Mountains was formed by thrust faulting and folding that uplifted these strata as a series of complexly deformed thrust sheets. During the Mesozoic and Cenozoic, the gradual uplift and erosion of this part of the Appalachian Mountains has continued.

Although a dense forest understory covers most of the mountain, outcroppings of the Copperhill Formation can be found on Kuwohi at the Forney Ridge Parking Lot at the end of Clingmans Dome Road. This outcrop exposes massive metaconglomerate of the Copperhill Formation. At this outcrop, it consists of massive 6-meter (20 ft) thick beds of micaceous quartzite. It contains coarse pebbles of quartz and feldspar, flat pebbles of fine-grained black graywacke, and egg-shaped concretions up to 30 centimeters (12 in) in diameter. These cobble-sized concretions are readily weathered to leave rust-stained depressions or cavities in the metaconglomerate.

Soils of Kuwohi are mostly moderately deep to shallow, well drained dark brown loam or sandy loam of strong to extreme acidity; Breakneck and Pullback series are most common.

== Climate ==
The climate of the summit of Kuwohi is humid continental (Köppen Dfb). The surrounding areas have an oceanic (Köppen Cfb) climate, as does most of the Blue Ridge Mountains. As with much of the southern Blue Ridge, the area qualifies as part of the Appalachian Temperate Rainforest.

Climate data for Kuwohi
Month	Jan	Feb	Mar	Apr	May	Jun	Jul	Aug	Sep	Oct	Nov	Dec	Year
Mean daily maximum °F (°C)	35 (2)	35 (2)	39 (4)	49 (9)	57 (14)	63 (17)	65 (18)	64 (18)	60 (16)	53 (12)	42 (6)	37 (3)	50 (10)
Mean daily minimum °F (°C)	19 (−7)	18 (−8)	24 (−4)	34 (1)	43 (6)	49 (9)	53 (12)	52 (11)	47 (8)	38 (3)	28 (−2)	21 (−6)	36 (2)
Average precipitation inches (mm)	7.0 (180)	8.2 (210)	8.2 (210)	6.5 (170)	6.0 (150)	6.9 (180)	8.3 (210)	6.8 (170)	5.1 (130)	5.4 (140)	6.4 (160)	7.3 (190)	82.1 (2,100)
Average snowfall inches (cm)	18 (46)	20 (51)	26 (66)	5 (13)	trace	0 (0)	0 (0)	0 (0)	trace	2 (5.1)	5 (13)	8 (20)	84 (214.1)
Source: "Great Smoky Mountains". National Park Service.

== Gallery ==
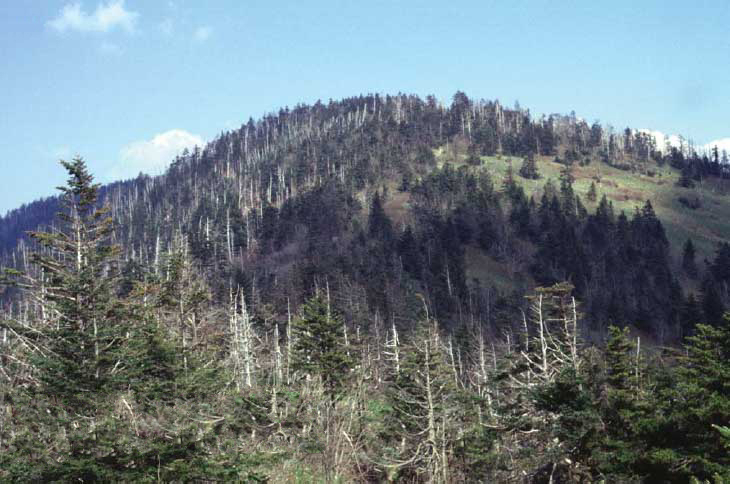
Kuwohi, with groves of dead trees

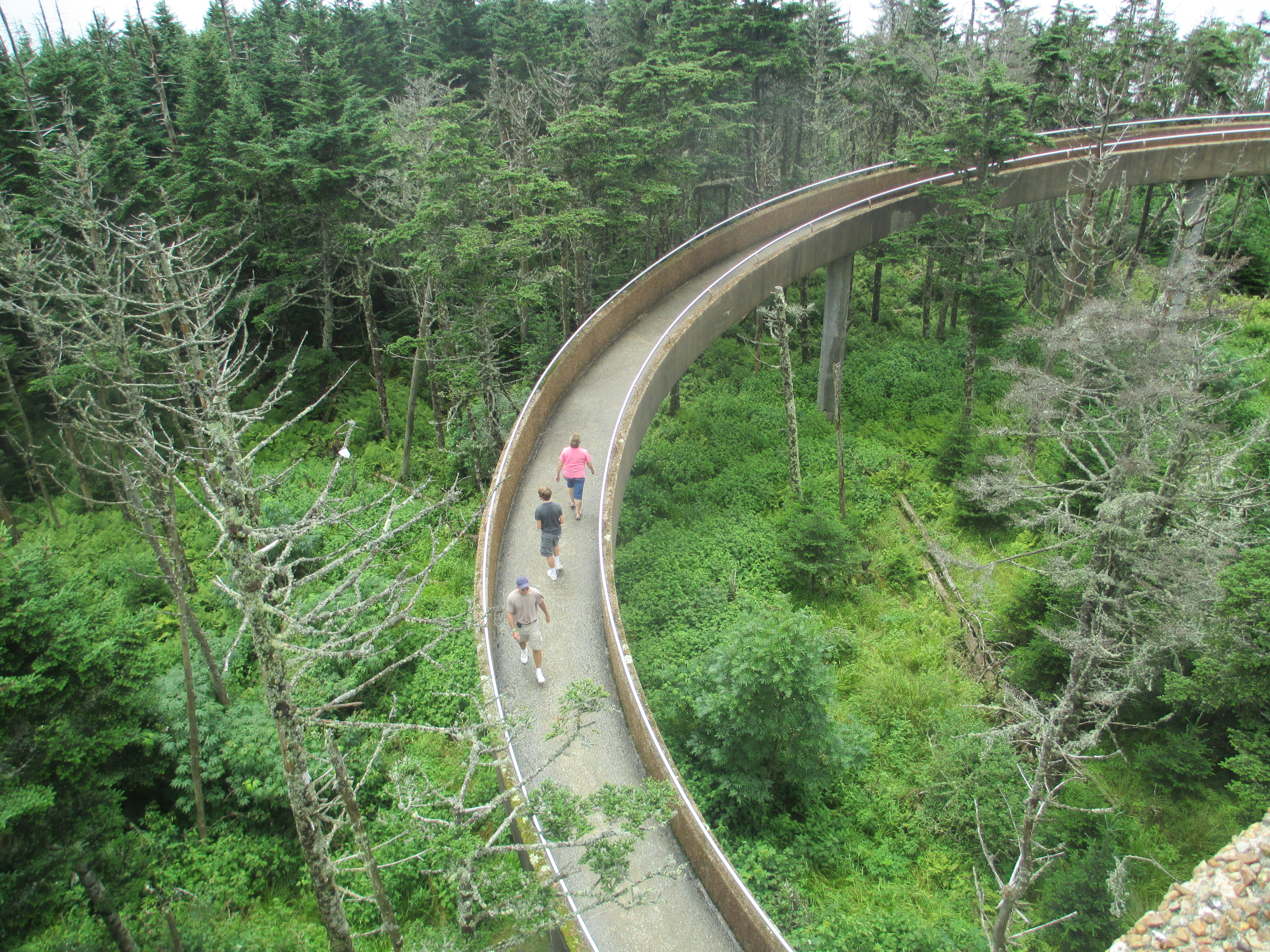
Base of the helical walkway ramp to the top of the observation tower

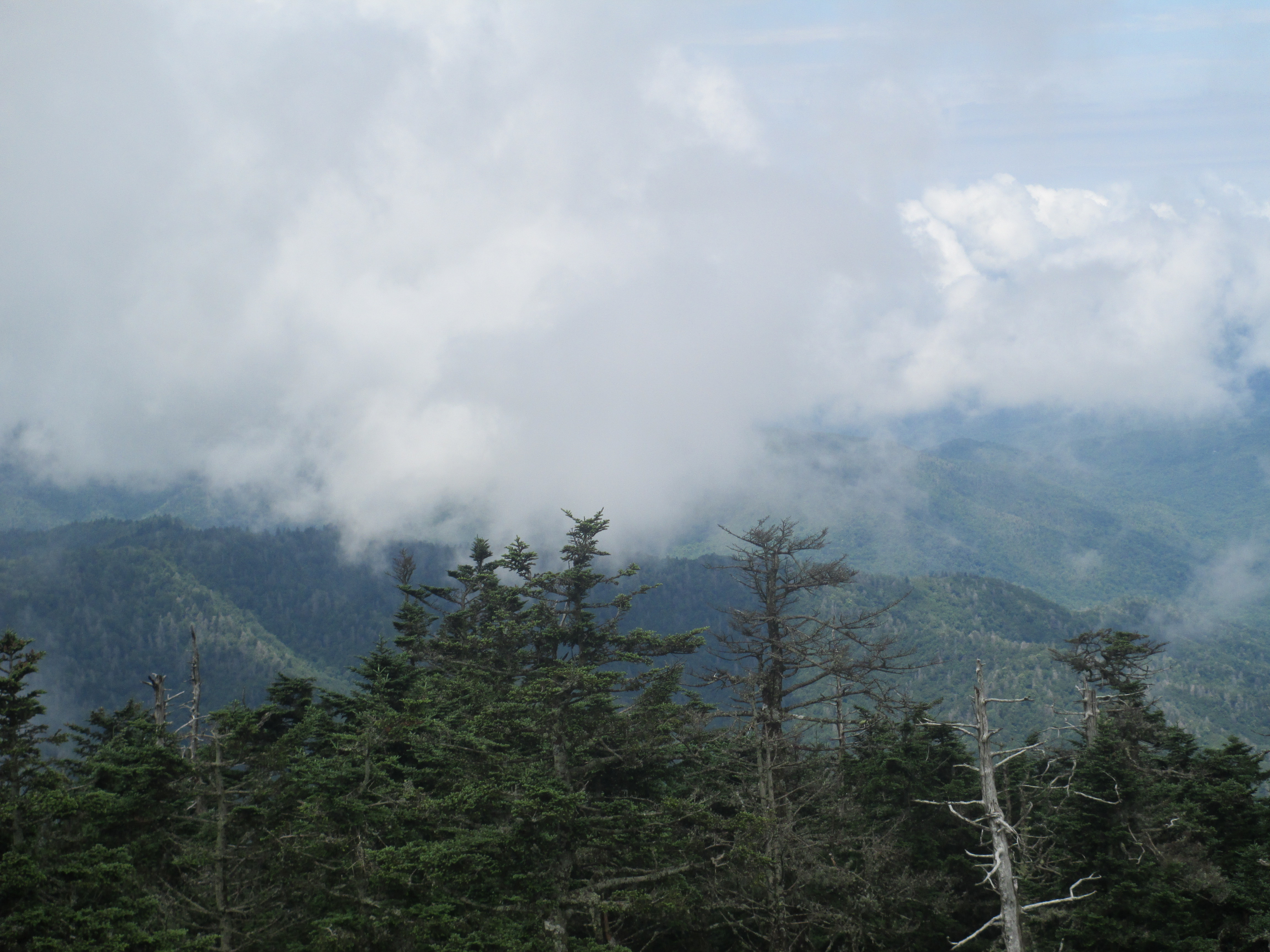
Mountains north of the observation tower obscured by low clouds.

== See also ==
- List of mountains in North Carolina
- List of U.S. states by elevation

== Bibliography ==
- Thornberry-Ehrlich, T (2008). "Great Smoky Mountains National Park Geologic Resource Evaluation Report. Natural Resource Report NPS/NRPC/GRD/NRR—2008/048" (PDF). Denver, Colorado: National Park Service. Archived from the original (PDF) on January 15, 2009.
