= Oconaluftee (disambiguation) =

Oconaluftee may refer to:

- Oconaluftee River — a river in North Carolina that drains the south-central Great Smoky Mountains before emptying into the Tuckasegee River
- Oconaluftee (Great Smoky Mountains) — a valley and historic area in the North Carolina section of the Great Smoky Mountains
- Oconaluftee Indian Village — a museum in Cherokee, North Carolina that recalls life in a typical 18th-century Cherokee village
