= Mingo Falls =

Waterfall

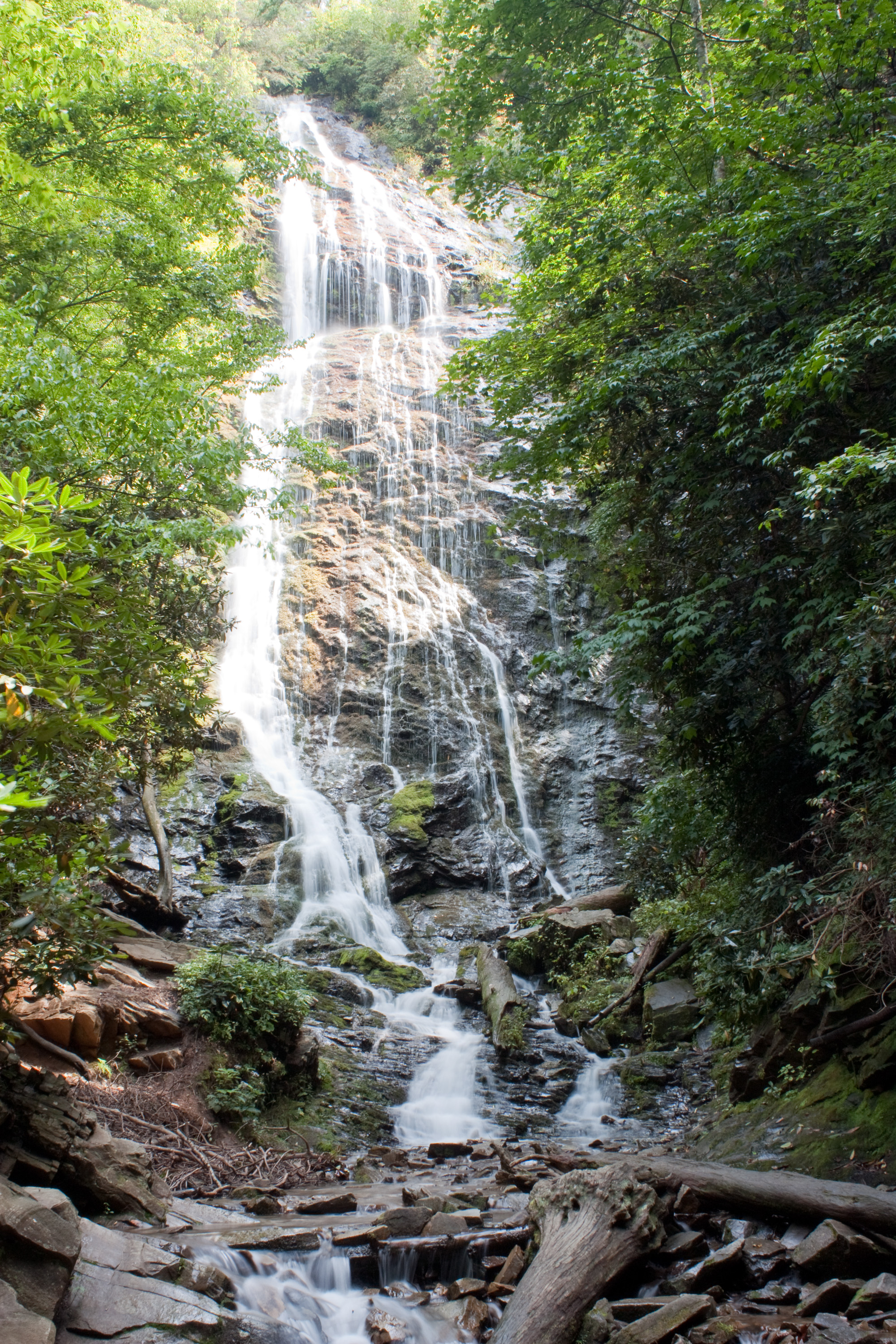
- Mingo Falls
- Interactive map of Mingo Falls
- Location: Qualla Boundary land trust, near Cherokee, Swain County, North Carolina
- Coordinates: 35.53184175°N 83.27455374°W
- Type: Cascade
- Total height: 120 ft (37 m)

Mingo Falls is a 120 ft (37 m) high waterfall located in the Qualla Boundary—a land trust of the Eastern Band of Cherokee Indians—near the town of Cherokee, Swain County, North Carolina in the Blue Ridge Mountains of the eastern United States. The waterfall is among the tallest in the southern Appalachians.

== Name ==
The official name of the falls originates from the Cherokee term Mingo which means Big Bear. The waterfall is also unofficially called Big Bear Falls.

== Geography ==
Mingo Falls is located on Mingo Creek in the Lower Raven Fork watershed of the Blue Ridge Mountains, before it empties into the Oconaluftee River, in close proximity to the Blue Ridge Parkway and the east entrance to Great Smoky Mountains National Park. The nearest town is Cherokee in the Qualla Boundary land trust.

== Trail ==
The Pigeon Creek Trail leads to Mingo Falls. The trailhead can be accessed from the National Park Service's Oconaluftee Visitor Center by driving south on US-441 toward the town of Cherokee, turning left at the second intersection onto Big Cove Road. Turn left again at the first stop sign and continue 4.5 miles (7.2 km) to Mingo Falls Campground where the trail begins. The trail is 0.4 miles (0.64 km) long and is considered moderately difficult.

No permits are required to drive into the Qualla Boundary or to hike on the trail to Mingo Falls.

== See also ==
- List of waterfalls
- List of waterfalls of North Carolina
