= Kristy Herron =

Native American photographer (born 20th century)

Kristy Maney Herron (born 20th century) is a Native American artist and photographer from Cherokee, North Carolina. She is Cherokee and Diné of the One Walks Around and Many Goats clans.

== Personal life and education ==
Herron was born and raised in Cherokee, North Carolina. Her family is from the Eastern Band of Cherokee Indians and the Navajo Nation.

Herron's interest in photography began in 1998. She holds a Bachelor of Fine Arts in Photography, which she earned from the Art Institute in Atlanta. She considers herself to be mostly self-taught.

== Photography and artistic works ==
Herron works primarily in digital photography. Her art centers the daily life, landscapes, and cultural practices around Cherokee, NC. Her works can be found in private collections and commercial media.

Herron cites Annie Liebovitz, Man Ray, and Edward Curtis as some of her inspirations.

== Exhibitions ==
=== Group exhibitions ===
- The 400 Years Project, digital
- This Land Calls Us Home, Hartsfield-Jackson Atlanta International Airport (2024), Robert W. Woodruff Library’s Schatten Gallery, Emory University (January 27 – July 20, 2025)
