= WRGC (AM) =

- Sylva, North Carolina; United States
- Broadcast area: Western North Carolina
- Frequency: 540 kHz
- Branding: 105.7 The River

Programming
- Format: Adult contemporary/Full service
- Affiliations: AP News; Westwood One; North Carolina News Network; Catamount Sports Network

Ownership
- Owner: Five Forty Broadcasting Company, LLC
- Sister stations: WBHN

History
- First air date: November 8, 1957 (as WMSJ on 1480)
- Former call signs: WMSJ (1957–1976)
- Former frequencies: 1480 kHz, 680 kHz
- Call sign meaning: W Ronnie G. Childress (son of founder Jimmy Childress)

Technical information
- Licensing authority: FCC
- Facility ID: 73286
- Class: B
- Power: 1,000 watts day 187 watts night
- Translator: 105.7 W289CK (Sylva)

Links
- Public license information: Public file; LMS
- Website: wrgc.com

WRGC is an Adult contemporary/full service formatted broadcast radio station licensed to Sylva, North Carolina, serving Western North Carolina. WRGC is owned and operated by Five Forty Broadcasting Company, LLC.

== History ==
=== 1480 AM ===
Jimmy Childress and Asheville resident Harold Thomas signed on WMSJ in November 1957, operating in Sylva, North Carolina (Jackson county) on 1480 kHz. The letters of its callsign stood for "Macon/Swain/Jackson," Macon and Swain being the counties immediately north and west, respectively, of Jackson County.

The station operated with a power of 5,000 watts, and only had daytime operation.

=== 680 AM ===
The station later moved to 680 kHz, with 1,000 watts, but allowing for a 250–watt directional nighttime signal.

The station's call sign was changed to WRGC in memory of Ronnie Childress, the former owner's son who was electrocuted while working on the transmitter during a thunderstorm in the 1970s (his initials were RGC).

For a significant portion of the station's history, the music format consisted primarily of country, along with some southern rock, along with news, community announcements, and local sports coverage.

In 1994, WRGC was one of 79 stations approved for the AM expanded band. The objective was to better cover Jackson County at night, when the station had to reduce power to protect WPTF. During the day, in addition to 20,000 Jackson County listeners, WRGC reached 30,000 listeners in Macon, Swain and Haywood Counties. WRGC would have moved to 1660 AM and increased from 1,000 watts to 10,000 during the day and from 250 to 1,000 watts at night.

Georgia-Carolina Radiocasting Company bought WRGC in 2002, changing the format from country and gospel to soft rock.

WRGC had about 8,000 listeners in Jackson, Macon and Swain Counties as of 2011, though 98 percent of its advertising revenue came from Jackson County. The Great Recession affected the station as several car dealers closed and other potential advertisers cut spending.

On August 31, 2011, the station turned off its transmitter. A posting on their website stated, "WRGC has left the air due to the severe economic conditions." The statement also addressed the permanency of this event, "Our long term plans for WRGC are not decided, but we have notified the Federal Communications Commission to go off the air until a decision is made." Art Sutton, president of Georgia-Carolina Radiocasting Company, hoped someone local could buy the station, because a local owner could "better develop relationships with those smaller businesses" needed to make a station successful, as his company's stations WNCC-FM and WFSC in nearby Franklin were.

=== 540 AM WRGC (Five Forty Broadcasting Company LLC.) ===
Roy Burnette of Five Forty Broadcasting Company LLC. announced plans to increase the daytime signal of WRGC to 5,000 watts (190 watts nighttime) and a move to 540 kHz, with the help of a county loan of $289,000, for which a public hearing was planned for December 12, 2011. Burnette said, "We want to offer in-depth service to Jackson, Macon, Swain and Haywood."

After test broadcasts on April 1, 2012, the new 540 AM WRGC officially signed on at 12:05 p.m. with a welcoming statement by new owner, Roy Burnette, and the playing of the National Anthem (the Star Spangled Banner). 540 AM is a Canadian and Mexican clear-channel frequency.

On April 5, 2018, Five Forty Broadcasting was granted an FM translator (105.7/W289CK) by the Federal Communications Commission.

In February 2020, the studios and offices of Five Forty Broadcasting Moved into a new facility near Highway 107 in Sylva, leaving the original location on Skyland Drive at the station's original transmitter site.

On March 15, 2021, Five Forty Broadcasting totally ceased operations from Skyland Drive in Sylva where the station had been since its inception, and erected a new tower off US 23/74 near Dillsboro.

WRGC currently broadcasts an adult contemporary music format, but additionally provides news updates, weather, and various community announcements throughout their broadcast day. The station also provides sports coverage of various sports teams from Western Carolina University and Smoky Mountain High School, as well as a local "buy-sell-and-trade call-in show" called "Tradio",
