= WRGC =

WRGC may refer to:

- WRGC (AM), a radio station (540 AM) licensed to Sylva, North Carolina, United States
- WRGC-FM, a radio station (88.3 FM) licensed under construction permit to Milledgeville, Georgia, United States
