= Smokies Life =

U.S. nonprofit organization

- Formation: 1953
- Type: Nonprofit
- Tax ID no.: 62-0576032
- Legal status: 501(c)(3)
- Headquarters: Gatlinburg, Tennessee
- Board Chair: Geoff Cantrell
- Chief Executive Officer: Laurel Rematore
- Board of directors: Geoff Cantrell; Jill Thompson; Lisa Davis; Janet Houston-Hickman; Mitch Crisp; Jerry DeWeese; Laura Jones; Laurie Macnair; Ed McAlister; Janet McCue; Royce Pevy; Brian Railsback
- Website: https://smokieslife.org/

Smokies Life is a nonprofit organization that supports Great Smoky Mountains National Park in the southeastern United States. It was authorized by Congress in 1953 to support the Park's educational, scientific, and historical programs.

Smokies Life supports the National Park Service through sales, labor, donations, and volunteering. Efforts include: distribution and publication of educational books and guides, funding visitor center exhibits and artifact collections, sponsoring free historic demonstrations and festivals, funding the Park's library, and helping to fund the environmental education program at the Institute at Tremont.

Since its creation in March 1953, Smokies Life has contributed over $30 million in aid to the Park, including the $3 million in construction costs for the Oconaluftee Visitor Center, opened in April 2011.

Smokies Life was previously known as Great Smoky Mountains Association until February 1, 2024.

== See also ==
- Wildflowers of the Great Smoky Mountains
- Cassius Cash
