= Cherokee Botanical Garden and Nature Trail =

Botanical garden and nature trail in North Carolina, US

Coordinates: 35°29′12.36″N 83°19′21.55″W

- Interactive map of Cherokee Botanical Garden and Nature Trail

The Cherokee Botanical Garden and Nature Trail is a botanical garden and nature trail located beside the Oconaluftee Indian Village, off U.S. Route 441 in Cherokee, North Carolina.

The garden displays more than 150 species of plants native to the Great Smoky Mountains, with an herb garden and 0.5 miles of walking trail through a mixed pine and hardwood forest along the slopes of Mount Noble.

== See also ==
- List of botanical gardens in the United States
