= WBHN =

- Bryson City, North Carolina; United States
- Broadcast area: Swain County, North Carolina
- Frequency: 1590 kHz
- Branding: 94.1 Classic Country

Programming
- Format: Classic Country
- Affiliations: Associated Press; North Carolina News Network; Westwood One

Ownership
- Owner: Roy Burnette; (Five Forty Broadcasting Company, LLC)
- Sister stations: WRGC

History
- First air date: October 1, 1967

Technical information
- Licensing authority: FCC
- Facility ID: 62338
- Class: D
- Power: 500 watts (day); 37 watts (night)
- Transmitter coordinates: 35°25′41.0″N 83°26′18.0″W
- Translator: 94.1 W231DQ (Bryson City)

Links
- Public license information: Public file; LMS
- Website: www.941classiccountry.com

WBHN is a Classic Country formatted broadcast radio station licensed to Bryson City, North Carolina, serving Swain County in North Carolina. WBHN is owned and operated by Roy Burnette.
