= WNCC (FM) =

Country radio station in Franklin, North Carolina

- Franklin, North Carolina; United States
- Frequency: 104.1 MHz
- Branding: 104.1 WNCC

Programming
- Format: Country
- Affiliations: ABC News Radio; Westwood One

Ownership
- Owner: Sutton Radiocasting Corporation
- Sister stations: WFSC

History
- First air date: 1965
- Former call signs: WFSC-FM (1965–1978); WRFR (1978–1999); WNCC-FM (1999–2014)
- Former frequencies: 96.7 MHz (1965–2016)

Technical information
- Licensing authority: FCC
- Facility ID: 14551
- Class: A
- ERP: 277 watts
- HAAT: 681 m (2,234 ft)
- Transmitter coordinates: 35°19′38.3″N 83°20′8.5″W
- Translators: 101.3 W267AD (Cherokee); (105.3 MHz) W287CD (Scaly)
- Repeater: 104.1 WNCC-FM1 (Bryson City)

Links
- Public license information: Public file; LMS
- Website: 1041wncc.com

WNCC (104.1 FM) is a radio station broadcasting a country music format. Licensed to serve Franklin, North Carolina, United States, the station is owned by Sutton Radiocasting Corporation, and features programming from ABC News Radio and Westwood One. Its main radio tower is located on Cowee Mountain, along with W267AD 101.3 and W285FD 104.9, and construction permits for W265AZ 100.9 and W262CE on 92.9.

W267AD and W285FD are listed as having WNCC as their primary station, and WNCC provided digital notification to the FCC, indicating that they are being used as a legal fiction for circumventing both local ownership caps and the rulemaking process of getting new stations on the air by simulcasting on WNCC's "HD Radio" digital subchannels. These supposed "broadcast translators" are instead intended to retransmit the main analog audio to areas blocked by the mountains, and are prohibited from carrying their own programming. W265AZ also shows WNCC as its primary station, but is still located atop Wayah Bald west of Franklin, and unlike the first two is not owned by Sutton. W262CE is owned by Sutton, but lists WFSC (1050 AM) in Franklin as its primary station, and is currently at 100.3 on Black Rock Mountain in a state park near Clayton, Georgia (where it is outside of WFSC's broadcast range, which is not permitted by the FCC). W267AD has Cherokee, North Carolina as its city of license, the others are all Franklin. W262CE has an effective power of 130 watts, while all of the others (including WNCC itself) are at or very close to 115 watts at the same height, indicating that they all share a single radio antenna through a diplexer.

== History ==
The station was first licensed on October 28, 1965, as WFSC-FM, the FM sister station to WFSC (1050 AM). The call sign changed to WRFR on April 4, 1978. At one time, WRFR played adult contemporary music. It became WNCC-FM in 1999, and dropped the "-FM" suffix in 2014.

Due to RF interference with several other nearby stations on the same frequency or adjacent frequencies, WNCC applied to move to 104.1 MHz. The station was issued a license to operate on that frequency on April 21, 2016, having previously been on 96.7 with 6000 watts at −101 meters (−331 ft) below the average local terrain. In July 2016, it signed on a co-channel booster station WNCC-FM1, located immediately south of downtown Bryson City and transmitting 40 watts of effective radiated power.
