= Charles George =

United States Army Medal of Honor recipient (1932–1952)

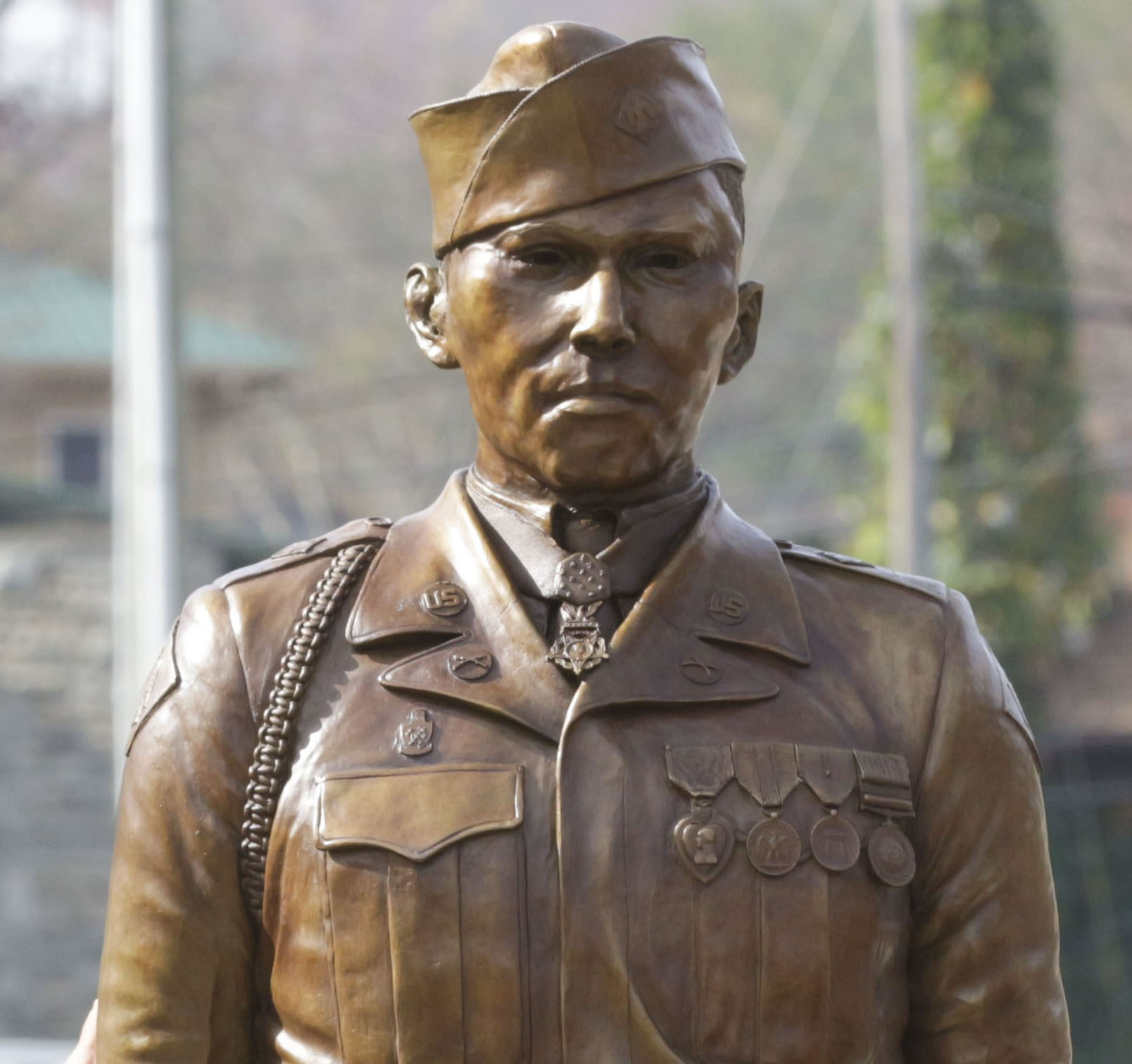
- Statue of Charles George
- Born: August 23, 1932; Cherokee, North Carolina, U.S.
- Died: November 30, 1952 (aged 20) near Songnae-dong, Korea
- Burial place: Yellow Hill Baptist Church Cemetery, Cherokee, North Carolina
- Military career
- Allegiance: United States
- Branch: United States Army
- Service years: 1951–1952
- Rank: Private First Class
- Units: Company C, 179th Infantry Regiment, 45th Infantry Division
- Conflicts: Korean War (DOW)
- Awards: Medal of Honor; Bronze Star Medal; Purple Heart

Charles George (August 23, 1932 – November 30, 1952) was a United States Army soldier who received the Medal of Honor for his actions in combat on November 30, 1952, during the Korean War. He was fatally wounded when he threw himself on a grenade to protect other soldiers in his company and was posthumously awarded the Medal of Honor.

== Biography ==
George was born in Cherokee, North Carolina, and was a member of the Eastern Band of Cherokee Indians. He entered service at Whittier, North Carolina. At the time of George's death in battle, he held the rank of private first class in Company C of the 179th Infantry Regiment, 45th Infantry Division. The action for which he received the Medal of Honor was near Songnae-dong, Korea.

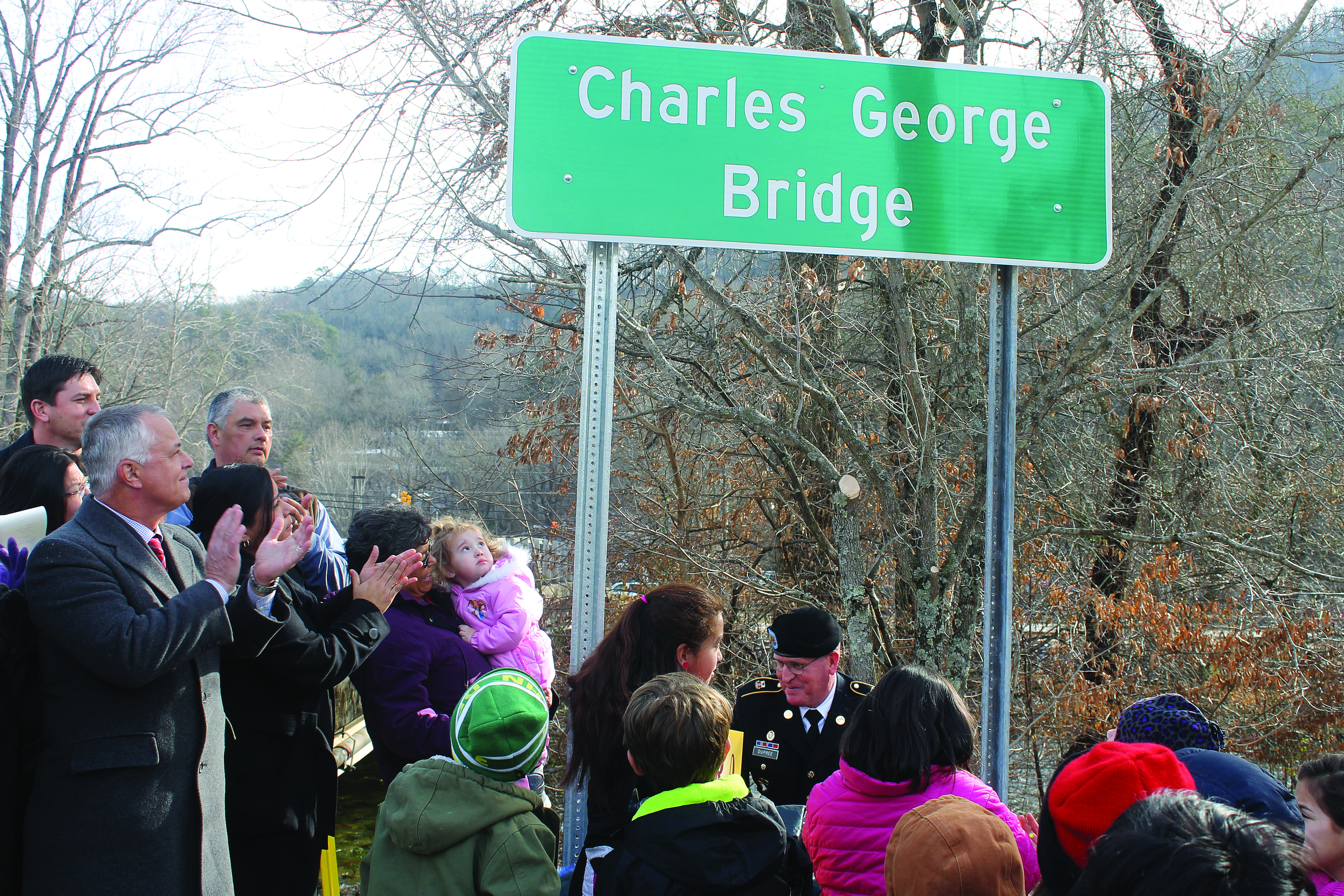
The new sign is unveiled for the bridge in Yellowhill.

A bridge in the Yellowhill Community of the Qualla Boundary is named in honor of PFC George. The bridge, which crosses the Oconaluftee River in the Yellowhill Community and connects US 441N and Acquoni Road, was officially dedicated on Thursday, Jan. 23, 2014. The Tribal Council of the Eastern Band of Cherokee Indians approved a resolution several years prior that gave approval to name the bridge after PFC George. That legislation was submitted by kindergarten and first grade students at New Kituwah Language Academy.

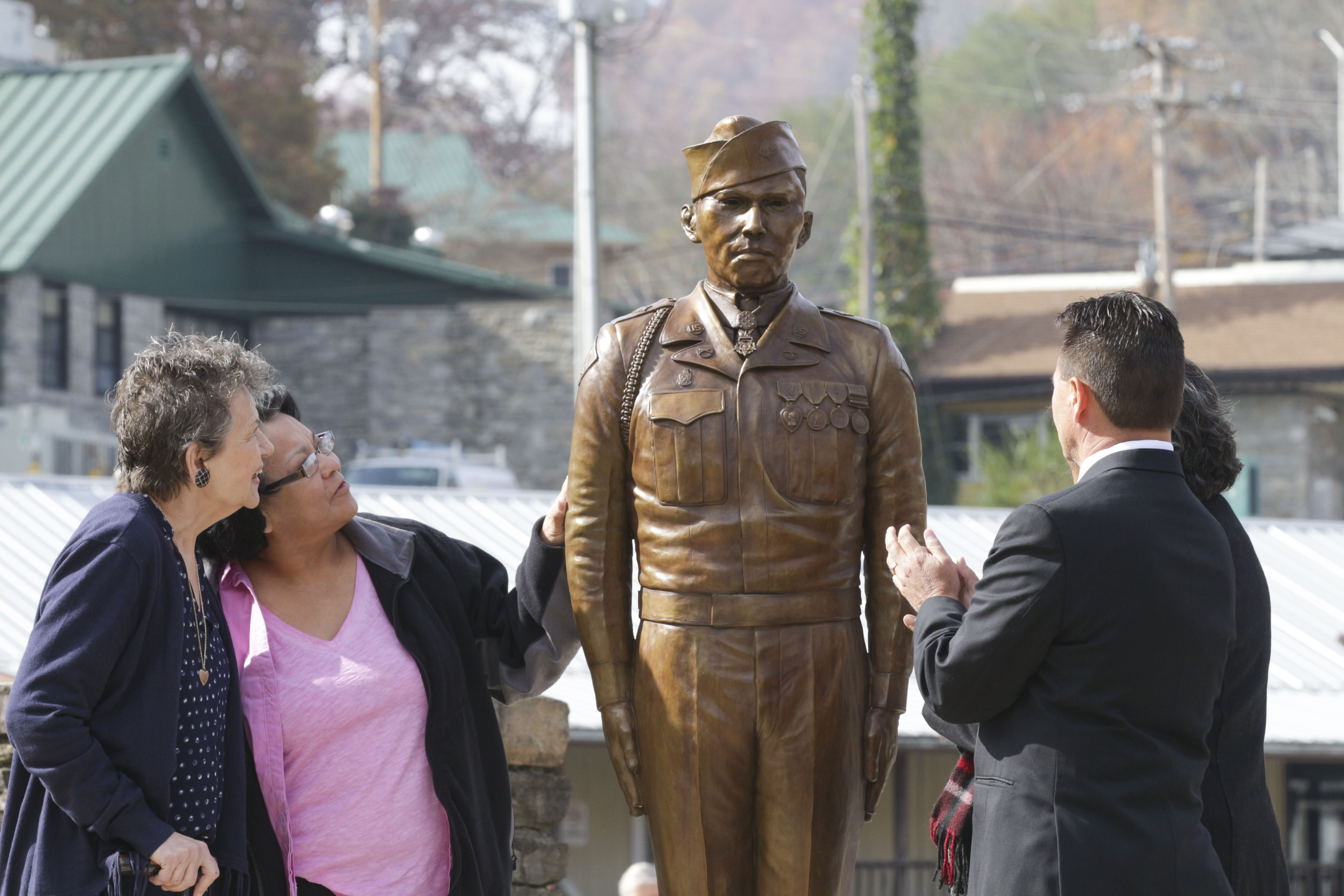
A bronze statue of PFC Charles George, is unveiled during a ceremony at the Cherokee Veterans Park.

A bronze statue of him was unveiled at the Charles George VA Medical Center (CGVAMC) in Asheville on Sept. 24, 2016. “What a privilege is it to honor a true American hero in such a memorable way,” said Cynthia Breyfogle, CGVAMC director, said at the event. “I was both thrilled and humbled when I first heard that we would receive this statue. The legacy of Charles George was, and still is, an inspiration and influence beyond his local community. His courage and example join those of other brave men and women, past and present, who have answered the call when their country needed them.” The statue was sculpted by James Spratt, a U.S. Navy veteran, who died on the same day it was unveiled.

Just two months later, an identical bronze statue was unveiled at the Cherokee Veterans Park in Cherokee, North Carolina, on Veteran's Day, November 11, 2016. Principal Chief Patrick Lambert stated at the event, "Standing out in front of this Park will be Private First Class Charles George, a Cherokee soldier who made the ultimate sacrifice for this country by diving on top of a grenade to save his comrades on the mission that he was on. Charles George, like many others, whose names appear on these walls represent everything that we should stand for in life, defenders of freedom, soldiers who stand up to the tyranny of oppression and who will sacrifice their own lives if that is what it demands.” Lew Harding, Steve Youngdeer American Legion Post 143 commander, said, "“Freedom rings in America today because of the sacrifices of common Americans with great courage, bravery, and resolve. Charles George, the brother that we honor here today, is one of those. There are also many of those here standing and sitting with us. I can look out in the audience and see so many.”

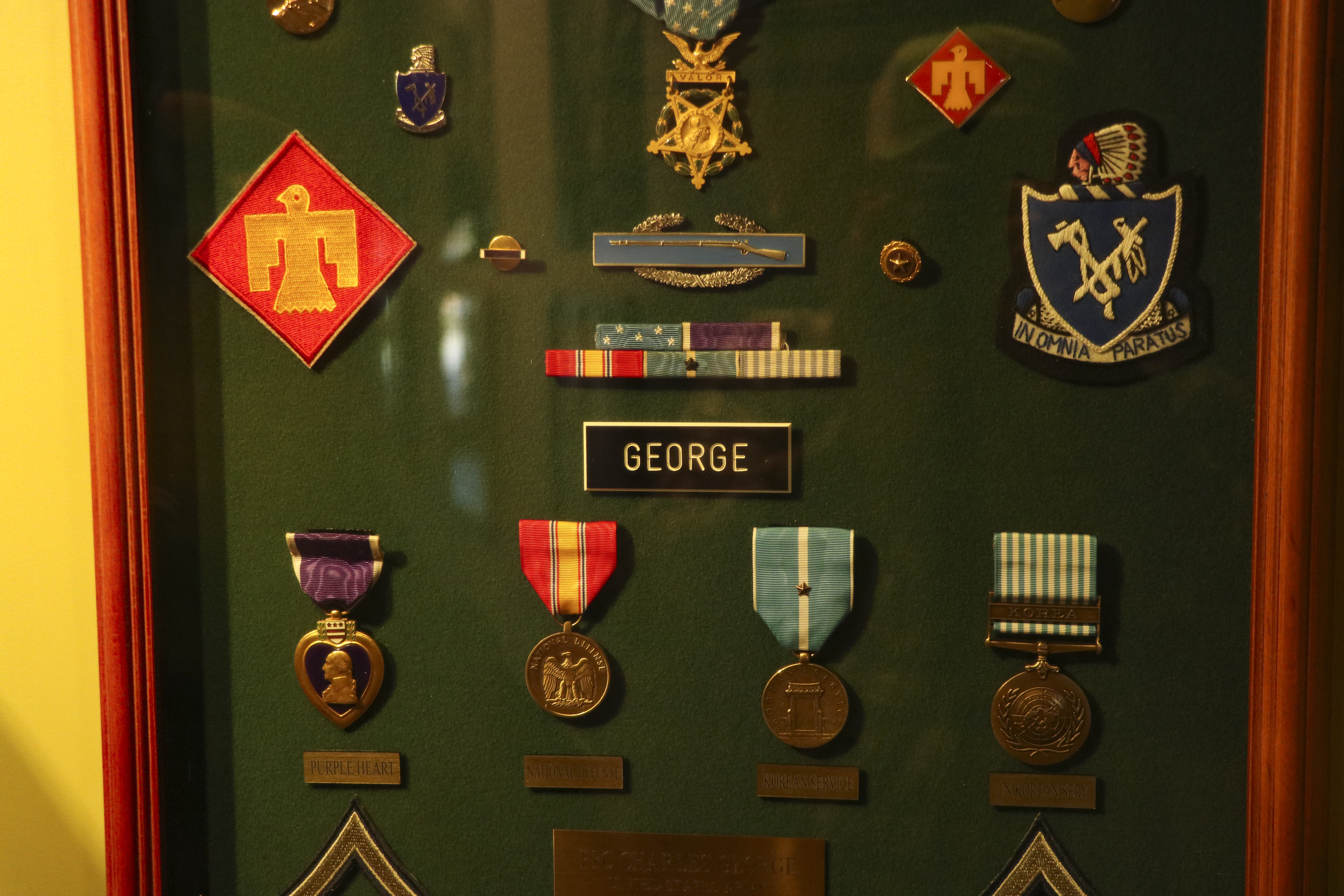
A display of PFC George's medals.

The Museum of the Cherokee Indian, located in Cherokee, N.C., opened a permanent exhibit honoring PFC George on May 28, 2018. “To honor this young man, I think it’s significant, especially on this Memorial Day, because so many of our brothers and sisters have lost their lives serving their country,” Lew Harding, Steve Youngdeer American Legion Post 143 commander, said at the event. “Few, a very few, receive the honor that this young man did. We are so proud of him as Eastern Cherokee, and we’re so happy that you’re here to witness this event to honor PFC Charles George, United States Army.” The main focal point of the exhibit is a bronze bust of George which was made from the mold formed and created by the late James Spratt, a U.S. Navy veteran who made the life-size bronze statues of George that stand proudly at the Charles George VA Medical Center in Asheville and the Cherokee Veterans Park. Also included in the exhibit is the U.S. flag they draped over George's coffin at his funeral, his medals including the Medal of Honor, and the entire text of his Medal of Honor citation. The display case itself was made by Jay Cooke of Sylva.

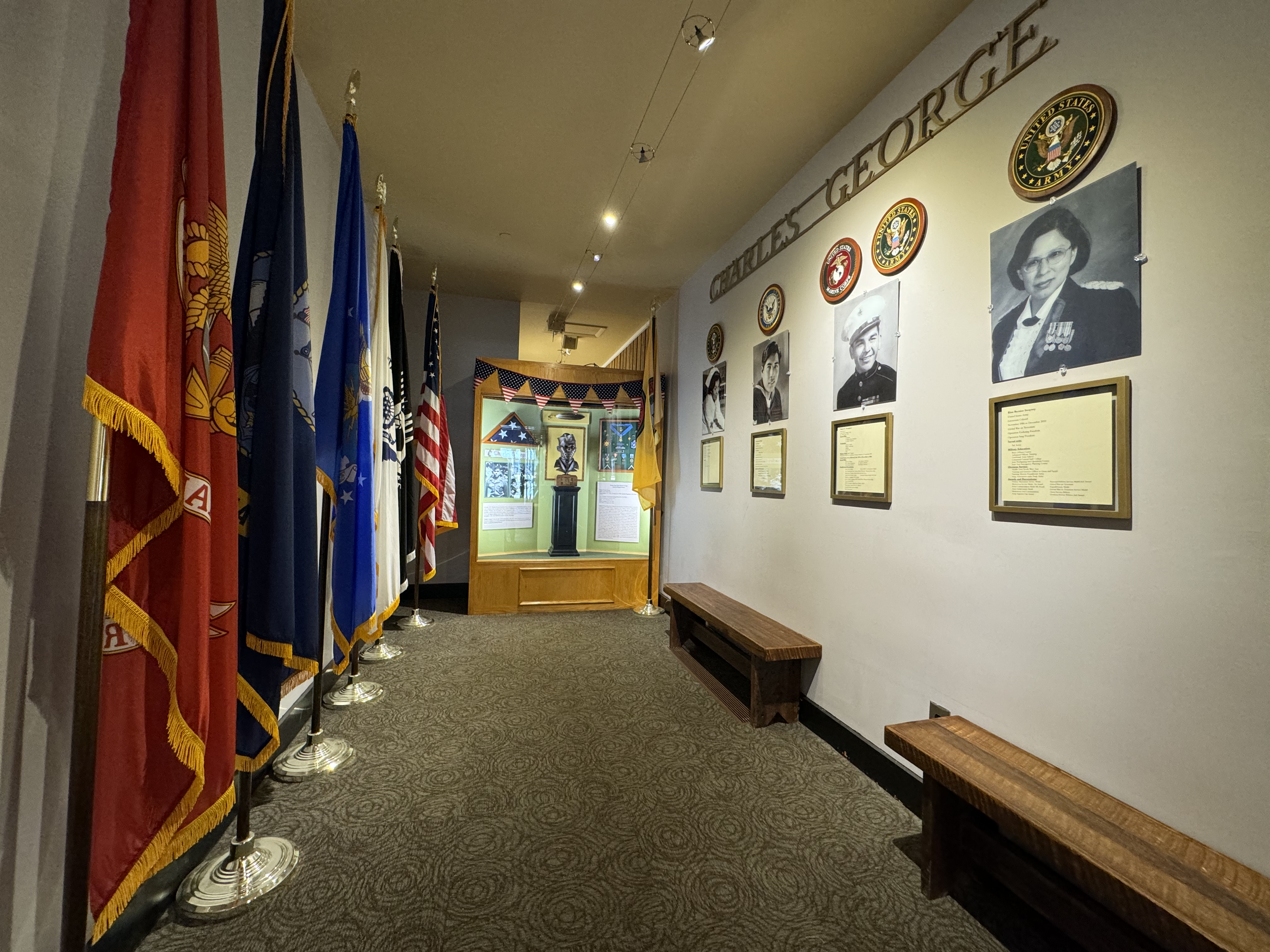
The Charles George Beloved Veterans Hall in 2023.

The Charles George Beloved Veterans Hall was opened officially at the Museum of the Cherokee Indian on Veteran's Day, Nov. 11, 2019. In addition to a display honoring PFC George, the Hall contains memorial displays for four EBCI Beloved Men and Women who were veterans including: Lula Owl Gloyne, a 2nd Lieutenant in the U.S. Army Nurse Corps in World War I; Jerry Wolfe, a U.S. Navy veteran who was part of the Normandy Invasion in World War II; former Principal Chief Robert S. Youngdeer, a Marine Corps and Army veteran who was wounded in World War II and received the Purple Heart; and Lt. Col. Kina Swayney, the highest ranking EBCI woman in the Tribe's history. "The four Beloved Men and Women, all veterans of the United States Armed Forces, honorably served,” Staff Sgt. (Ret.) Warren Dupree, of the Steve Youngdeer American Legion Post 143, said during the Hall's opening. “Once they separated from active duty, they returned home to continue that service in their community. They took their lives, both military and civilian professional lives, to an extremely high level. They were and are true role models for our youth."

The Charles George Memorial Arena at Cherokee High School in Cherokee, North Carolina, is also named in his honor.

== Medal of Honor citation ==
The Medal of Honor was awarded on March 18, 1954. The citation read:

Pfc. George, a member of Company C, distinguished himself by conspicuous gallantry and outstanding courage above and beyond the call of duty in action against the enemy on the night of November 30, 1952. He was a member of a raiding party committed to engage the enemy and capture a prisoner for interrogation. Forging up the rugged slope of the key terrain feature, the group was subjected to intense mortar and machine gun fire and suffered several casualties. Throughout the advance, he fought valiantly and, upon reaching the crest of the hill, leaped into the trenches and closed with the enemy in hand-to-hand combat. When friendly troops were ordered to move back upon completion of the assignment, he and 2 comrades remained to cover the withdrawal. While in the process of leaving the trenches a hostile soldier hurled a grenade into their midst. Pfc. George shouted a warning to 1 comrade, pushed the other soldier out of danger, and, with full knowledge of the consequences, unhesitatingly threw himself upon the grenade, absorbing the full blast of the explosion. Although seriously wounded in this display of valor, he refrained from any outcry which would divulge the position of his companions. The 2 soldiers evacuated him to the forward aid station and shortly thereafter he succumbed to his wound. Pfc. George's indomitable courage, consummate devotion to duty, and willing self-sacrifice reflect the highest credit upon himself and uphold the finest traditions of the military service.

== Awards and decorations ==

| Badge | Combat Infantryman Badge | | |
| 1st row | Medal of Honor | | Bronze Star Medal |
| 2nd row | Purple Heart | Army Good Conduct Medal | National Defense Service Medal |
| 3rd row | Korean Service Medal with 1 Campaign star | United Nations Service Medal Korea | Korean War Service Medal |
| Unit awards | Presidential Unit Citation | | |

== Charles George VA Medical Center ==
The VA Medical Center in Asheville, North Carolina is named in honor of Charles George and thus is officially known as the Charles George VA Medical Center.

Several boys recovered George's Purple Heart, Bronze Star and GCM in an antique shop. The owner donated the medals on the condition the boys find the family and return them, which they did.

== See also ==
- List of Korean War Medal of Honor recipients
