= WFSC =

- Franklin, North Carolina; United States
- Frequency: 1050 kHz
- Branding: 104.9FM WFSC

Programming
- Format: Classic hits

Ownership
- Owner: Sutton Radiocasting Corporation
- Sister stations: WNCC

History
- First air date: 1957
- Call sign meaning: "With Friends in Seven Counties"

Technical information
- Licensing authority: FCC
- Facility ID: 14554
- Class: D
- Power: 5,000 watts day; 153 watts night
- Transmitter coordinates: 35°12′40.3″N 83°22′6.5″W
- Translator: 104.9 W285FD (Franklin)

Links
- Public license information: Public file; LMS
- Webcast: Listen live
- Website: www.1050wfsc.com

WFSC (1050 AM) is a radio station broadcasting a classic hits format. Licensed to Franklin, North Carolina, United States, it serves the Franklin area. The station is owned by Sutton Radiocasting Corporation.

The station is an affiliate of the Atlanta Braves radio network, the largest radio affiliate network in Major League Baseball.

In early 2016, the station began simulcasting their content on FM translator W285FD at 104.9 MHz.
