= Oconaluftee River =

River in the eastern United States

Oconaluftee River Egwanulti
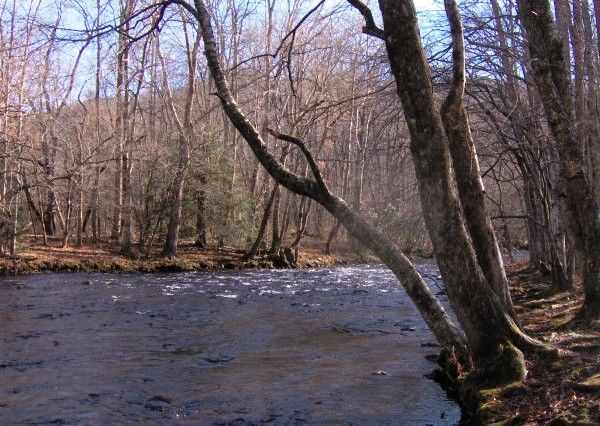
- View of the Oconaluftee River within the Great Smoky Mountains National Park
- Native name: Ocona Luftee (Cherokee); Oconalufty (Cherokee)

Location
- Country: United States
- State: North Carolina

Physical characteristics
- Source: Confluence of Beech Flats Prong and Kephart Prong
  - coordinates: 35°35′14.4″N 83°21′42.9″W
- Mouth
  - location: Tuckasegee River
  - coordinates: 35°26′45.9″N 83°23′1.3″W
- Length: 30 mi (48 km)
- Discharge
  - location: Ela, NC
  - average: 518 cu ft/s (14.7 m^{3}/s)

Basin features
- River system: Tuckasegee → Little Tennessee → Tennessee → Ohio → Mississippi

The Oconaluftee River drains the south-central Oconaluftee valley of the Great Smoky Mountains in Western North Carolina before emptying into the Tuckasegee River. The river flows through the Qualla Boundary, a federal land trust that serves as a reserve for the Eastern Band of the Cherokee, the only federally recognized tribe in North Carolina. They bought the land back from the federal government in the 1870s, after having been pushed off and forced to cede it earlier in the 19th century. Several historic Cherokee towns are known to have been located along this river.

== Hydrography ==
Beech Flats Prong is a stream formed by the convergence of several spring outlets high in the Appalachians near Newfound Gap, a mountain pass that straddles the Tennessee–North Carolina border in the center of the Great Smoky Mountains National Park. The stream flows about 10 miles (16 km) south where it merges with Smith Branch, Kepharts Prong, and the Kanati Fork to form the Oconaluftee River. The river continues south, where it is joined by the Bradley Fork, which greatly strengthens its flow. A large, flat bottomland is created by the river's confluence with the Raven Fork at Cherokee, North Carolina, where the river turns westward, flowing to its mouth on the Tuckasegee River.

Present-day Bryson City in Swain County developed just upriver of this confluence. The Oconaluftee passes through the settlements of Smokemount, the Oconaluftee Village and Hospital, the town of Cherokee, base of the EBCI; Indian Hills, and Birdtown before emptying into the Tuckasegee.

== History ==
For thousands of years, indigenous peoples occupied this region, generally living near the waterways. The historic Cherokee people occupied this region as their traditional homelands long before European encounter. They considered the Ocona Luftee waters to be sacred. The name "Ocona Luftee" was derived from the name of the Cherokee village, Egwanulti, which was developed on its banks prior to the area's colonization by European frontiersmen. The name translates to "by the river" in English. The river and the village were named by the Cherokee prior to the arrival in this area of John Bartram, an English colonial explorer from Philadelphia.

During the 1830s and the time of Indian removals from the Southeast, the Cherokee were allowed the chance to purchase plots of land for individual households, if they agreed to leave the tribe. They were then considered U.S. and state citizens, not subject to removal.

About 500 Cherokee led by Yonaguska lived on land along the Oconaluftee, which was owned by William Holland Thomas, a white man who held it in trust for the Cherokee, to protect it for them. They were originally prohibited from buying land where the European Americans were settling. He had been adopted by the Cherokee as a boy, and he enabled this band of Cherokee to remain, safe from removal. They were joined by a smaller band of about 150 people, who lived along the Nantahala River and were led by Utsala. Other groups living in Snowbird and along the Cheoah River (in Tomotley) also stayed in the region. If needed, they could all gather on the land held in trust by Thomas and be protected. Today their descendants comprise most of the Eastern Band of Cherokee, numbering approximately 2,000 people. In the 1870s, the Cherokee people expanded their lands in North Carolina with the purchase of the Qualla Boundary.

Since the late 20th century, archeological remains have been found in the eleven westernmost counties of North Carolina, especially in the flat bottomlands about the mouth of Mingus Creek, Toe String Creek, Bradley Fork, and Collins Creek.
