= Oconaluftee Indian Village =

Replica Native American settlement

Coordinates: 35.4867655°N 83.3226525°W

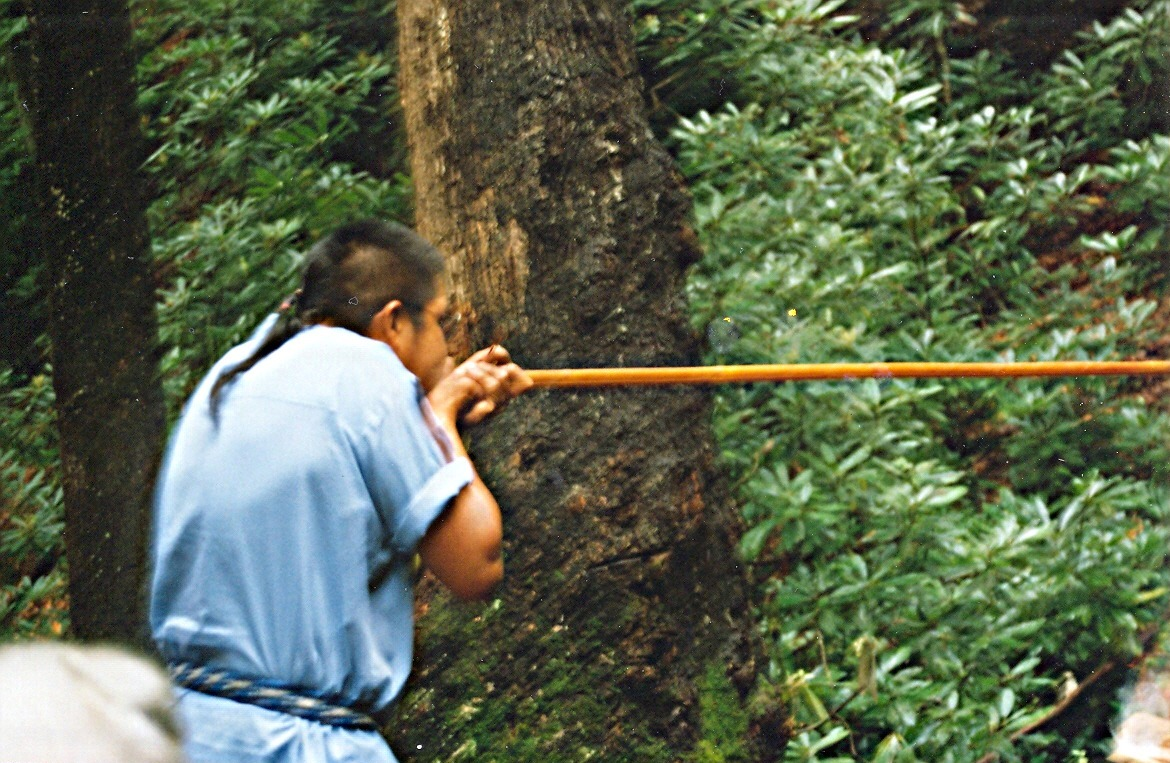
Blowgun demonstration in Oconaluftee Indian Village, Cherokee, North Carolina

The Oconaluftee Indian Village is a replica of an 18th-century eastern Cherokee community founded in 1952 and located along the Oconaluftee River in Cherokee, North Carolina, United States.

== History ==
The Cherokee "living museum" was founded by the Eastern Band of Cherokee in 1952, and is operated by the Cherokee Historical Association. The Eastern Band of Cherokee also established other local attractions, including in 1948 with the Museum of the Cherokee Indian; and in 1950 with the Unto These Hills outdoor theater series. Guides take visitors through the village explaining the history and culture of the Cherokee and also demonstrate the making of such items as arrowheads, baskets, and blowguns.

== See also ==
- Cherokee Botanical Garden and Nature Trail
