= Cherokee, North Carolina =

Cherokee, North Carolina ᏣᎳᎩ (Cherokee)
- Census-designated place
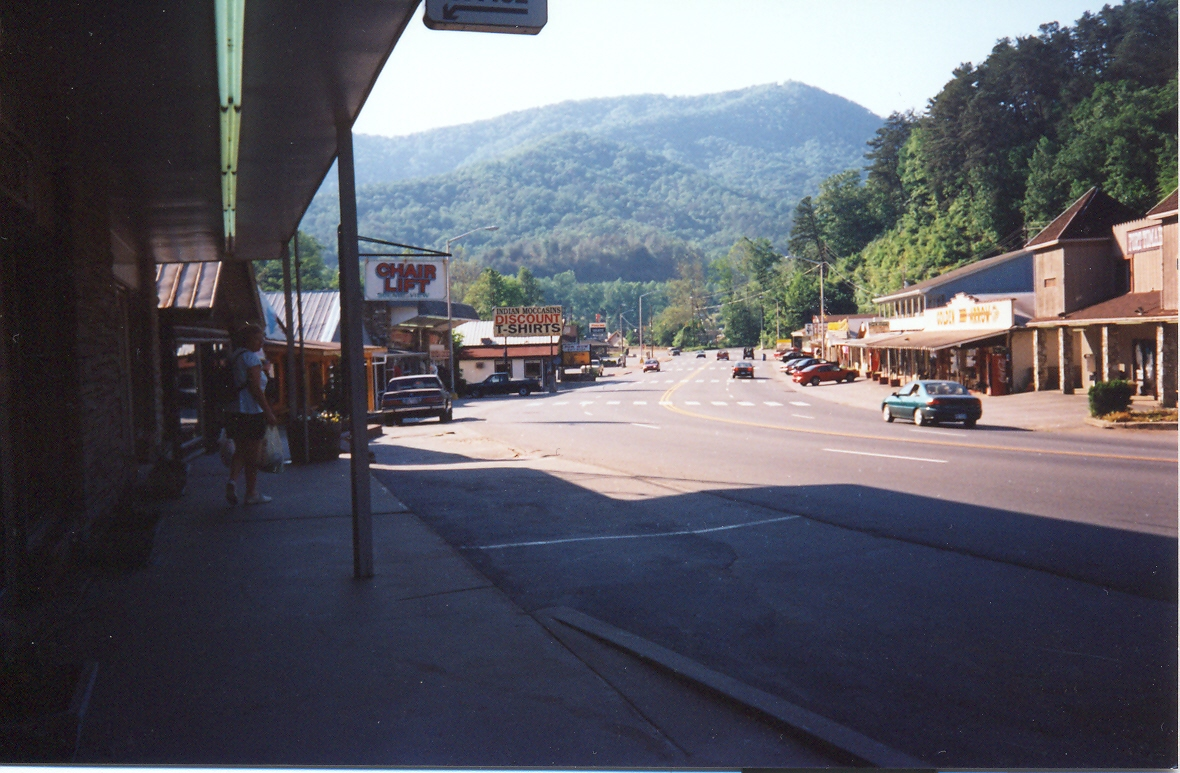
- Tsalagi Road
- Motto: "Trails of Legends and Adventures"
- Interactive map of Cherokee, North Carolina
- Coordinates: 35°28′37″N 83°19′13″W
- Country: United States
- State: North Carolina
- Counties: Swain and Jackson

Area
  - Total: 12.07 sq mi (31.26 km^{2})
  - Land: 12.07 sq mi (31.26 km^{2})
  - Water: 0 sq mi (0.00 km^{2})
- Elevation: 2,438 ft (743 m)

Population (2020)
  - Total: 2,195
  - Density: 181.8/sq mi (70.21/km^{2})
- Time zone: UTC−5 (Eastern (EST))
  - Summer (DST): UTC−4 (EDT)
- ZIP code: 28719
- Area code: 828
- FIPS code: 37-12140
- GNIS feature ID: 2629369

Cherokee /ˈtʃɛrəˌkiː/ (Cherokee: ᏣᎳᎩ, romanized: Tsalagi) is a census-designated place (CDP) in Swain and Jackson counties in Western North Carolina, United States, within the Qualla Boundary land trust. Cherokee is located in the Oconaluftee River Valley around the intersection of U.S. Routes 19 and 441. As of the 2020 census, the CDP had a population of 2,195. It is the capital of the federally recognized Eastern Band of Cherokee Indians, one of three recognized Cherokee tribes and the only one in North Carolina.

The community also serves as a tourist destination, with numerous campgrounds, motels, and hotels serving visitors to the Great Smoky Mountains National Park, with a major entrance to the park lying within the community. The Cherokee Historical Association runs the Oconaluftee Indian Village, a living-history museum, as well as the popular outdoor drama Unto These Hills, and is associated with the Museum of the Cherokee People. Cherokee serves as the southern terminus of the Blue Ridge Parkway. The Oconaluftee River flows through the town and is popular for tubing.

== History ==
Cherokee is the capital of the Eastern Band of Cherokee Indians and part of the traditional homelands of the Cherokee people. In the 1870s, the Eastern Band purchased the land for what is called the "Qualla Boundary". To continue the heritage of the Cherokee in the town, several signs for Cherokee's streets and buildings are written in both Cherokee syllabary and English. As a census-designated place (CDP), Cherokee overlaps most or part of three of the seven communities of the Qualla Boundary: Painttown, Wolftown, and Yellowhill.

== Geography ==
Cherokee and its surrounding Qualla Boundary is in the very mountainous Swain and Jackson counties. The highest elevation is 6,643-foot (2,025 m) Kuwohi at the border with Tennessee. Kuwohi is the highest point in the Great Smoky Mountains National Park. The Oconaluftee River flows through downtown Cherokee.

== Demographics ==
Historical population
Census	Pop.	Note	%±
2010	2,138		—
2020	2,195		2.7%
U.S. Decennial Census

Cherokee first appeared as a census designated place in the 2010 U.S. census.

=== Racial and ethnic composition ===
Cherokee CDP, North Carolina – Racial and ethnic composition Note: the US Census treats Hispanic/Latino as an ethnic category. This table excludes Latinos from the racial categories and assigns them to a separate category. Hispanics/Latinos may be of any race.
Race / Ethnicity (NH = Non-Hispanic)	Pop 2010	Pop 2020	% 2010	% 2020
White alone (NH)	300	206	14.03%	9.38%
Black or African American alone (NH)	10	20	0.47%	0.91%
Native American or Alaska Native alone (NH)	1,570	1,643	73.43%	74.85%
Asian alone (NH)	24	27	1.12%	1.23%
Native Hawaiian or Pacific Islander alone (NH)	0	0	0.00%	0.00%
Other race alone (NH)	1	5	0.05%	0.23%
Mixed race or Multiracial (NH)	119	146	5.57%	6.65%
Hispanic or Latino (any race)	114	148	5.33%	6.74%
Total	2,138	2,195	100.00%	100.00%

=== 2020 census ===
As of the 2020 census, Cherokee had a population of 2,195. The median age was 35.5 years. 26.0% of residents were under the age of 18 and 14.5% of residents were 65 years of age or older. For every 100 females there were 93.4 males, and for every 100 females age 18 and over there were 90.2 males age 18 and over.

0.0% of residents lived in urban areas, while 100.0% lived in rural areas.

There were 816 households and 561 families in Cherokee, of which 41.3% had children under the age of 18 living in them. Of all households, 34.6% were married-couple households, 21.1% were households with a male householder and no spouse or partner present, and 35.8% were households with a female householder and no spouse or partner present. About 26.8% of all households were made up of individuals and 8.5% had someone living alone who was 65 years of age or older.

There were 918 housing units, of which 11.1% were vacant. The homeowner vacancy rate was 0.0% and the rental vacancy rate was 13.9%.

== Climate ==
Climate data for Cherokee, North Carolina, 1991–2020 normals
Month	Jan	Feb	Mar	Apr	May	Jun	Jul	Aug	Sep	Oct	Nov	Dec	Year
Mean daily maximum °F (°C)	46.3 (7.9)	50.6 (10.3)	58.6 (14.8)	68.0 (20.0)	74.7 (23.7)	80.1 (26.7)	82.7 (28.2)	82.0 (27.8)	77.9 (25.5)	68.8 (20.4)	58.3 (14.6)	49.2 (9.6)	66.4 (19.1)
Daily mean °F (°C)	36.4 (2.4)	39.6 (4.2)	46.4 (8.0)	55.2 (12.9)	62.9 (17.2)	69.6 (20.9)	72.7 (22.6)	71.7 (22.1)	66.4 (19.1)	55.9 (13.3)	45.9 (7.7)	39.2 (4.0)	55.2 (12.9)
Mean daily minimum °F (°C)	26.4 (−3.1)	28.7 (−1.8)	34.2 (1.2)	42.3 (5.7)	51.2 (10.7)	59.1 (15.1)	62.8 (17.1)	61.4 (16.3)	55.0 (12.8)	43.0 (6.1)	33.4 (0.8)	29.3 (−1.5)	43.9 (6.6)
Average precipitation inches (mm)	4.74 (120)	5.00 (127)	5.84 (148)	4.93 (125)	4.71 (120)	5.13 (130)	5.21 (132)	4.21 (107)	4.04 (103)	3.06 (78)	4.18 (106)	5.66 (144)	56.71 (1,440)
Average snowfall inches (cm)	2.6 (6.6)	0.9 (2.3)	0.9 (2.3)	0.0 (0.0)	0.0 (0.0)	0.0 (0.0)	0.0 (0.0)	0.0 (0.0)	0.0 (0.0)	0.0 (0.0)	0.1 (0.25)	2.0 (5.1)	6.5 (17)
Average precipitation days (≥ 0.01 in)	10.6	10.8	11.9	10.4	12.2	11.8	14.0	12.4	9.4	7.7	8.9	11.1	131.2
Average snowy days (≥ 0.1 in)	1.4	1.2	0.6	0.0	0.0	0.0	0.0	0.0	0.0	0.0	0.1	0.7	4.0
Source: NOAA

== Economy ==
The EBCI negotiated an agreement with the state, and in 1997 opened Harrah's Cherokee Casino for gaming. It has generated jobs and revenue for the tribe, providing money that the EBCI applies to its people's education, welfare and culture. In 2005, nearly four million people visited the casino and generated a per capita profit of roughly $8,000 annually. Each member of the tribe is paid some annual income; the tribe reinvests other monies for health and related services, and long-term development.

Since the late 20th century, most manufacturing and textile plants left the area, moving their jobs offshore to lower wage areas, such as Southeast Asia. The regional economy suffered. Many of the Cherokee had to rely on jobs related to national park tourism and recreation, which provided work for about half of the year. Many tribal members had to rely on public assistance to survive during the winter.

== Tourism ==
Cherokee is a tourist-oriented area, located at the entrance to Great Smoky Mountains National Park and at the southern end of the Blue Ridge Parkway. In addition to the casino, it is the site of attractions such as:

- Cherokee Botanical Garden and Nature Trail
- Trail to Mount Guyot
- Museum of the Cherokee Indian
- Oconaluftee Indian Village
- Oconaluftee (Great Smoky Mountains)
- Qualla Arts & Crafts Mutual
- Oconaluftee River

Eastern Cherokee history, culture, and crafts are portrayed in the historical drama Unto These Hills, presented annually during the tourist season.

The Cherokee area offers many campgrounds, trails and river adventures. It is also home to three roadside attractions with zoos: Cherokee Bear Zoo, Chief Saunooke Bear Park, and Santa's Land.

The zoos have been considered controversial. Bob Barker, a retired game show host and animal rights activist, has called for closing the black bear zoos at these attractions.

Cherokee Wonderland and Frontier Land were two amusement parks that operated in the area in the late 1960s and into the early 21st century, respectively. The latter was converted into a water park before being closed to make way for development of Harrah's Cherokee. When they were open, both parks featured their own 3 ft (914 mm) narrow gauge railroads (named Cherokee Wonderland Railroad and Frontier Land Railroad).

== Notable people ==
- Walker Calhoun – musician, dancer, and teacher
- Amanda Crowe – woodcarver and educator
- Raymond Fairchild – banjo player
- Charles George – Medal of Honor recipient
- Edwin George – folk artist and muralist
- Leon Miller – American football player and lacrosse coach
- Clyde Moody – bluegrass musician
- Stan Powell – NFL player for the Oorang Indians

== Education ==
Cherokee Central Schools operates the K–12 public schools. Cherokee High School is the local high school.

The private elementary school, New Kituwah Academy, is based on language immersion in Cherokee.

Previously the Bureau of Indian Affairs (BIA) provided educational services, and in their schools students were not permitted to speak Cherokee.

== Popular culture ==
Scenes from movies such as Davy Crockett, King of the Wild Frontier, Digging to China, Forces of Nature, The Fugitive, and Stroszek were shot in Cherokee.

== Media ==
The Cherokee One Feather newspaper has served the community for decades.

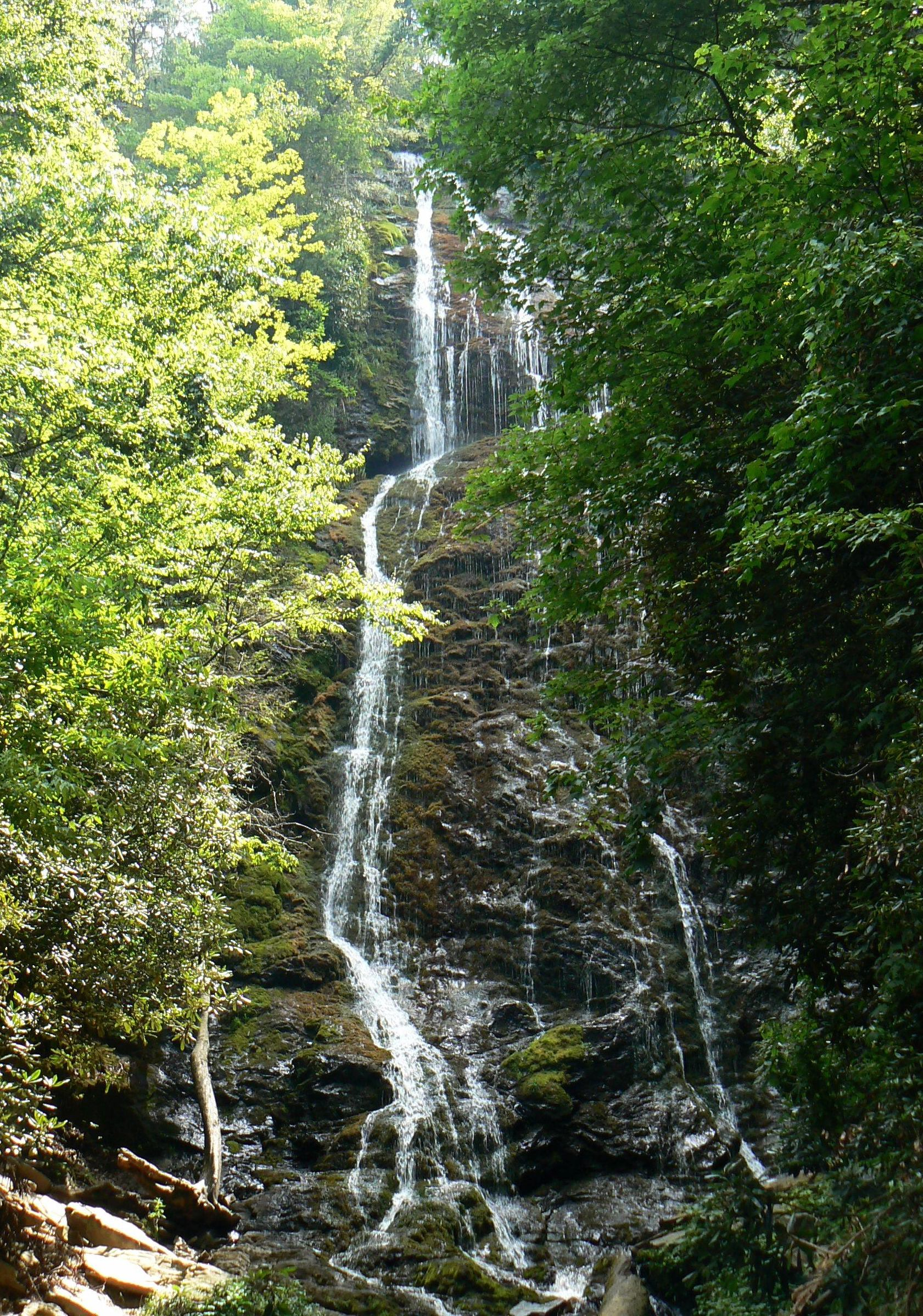
Mingo Falls near Cherokee drops about 120 feet (37 m) during moderately dry weather.

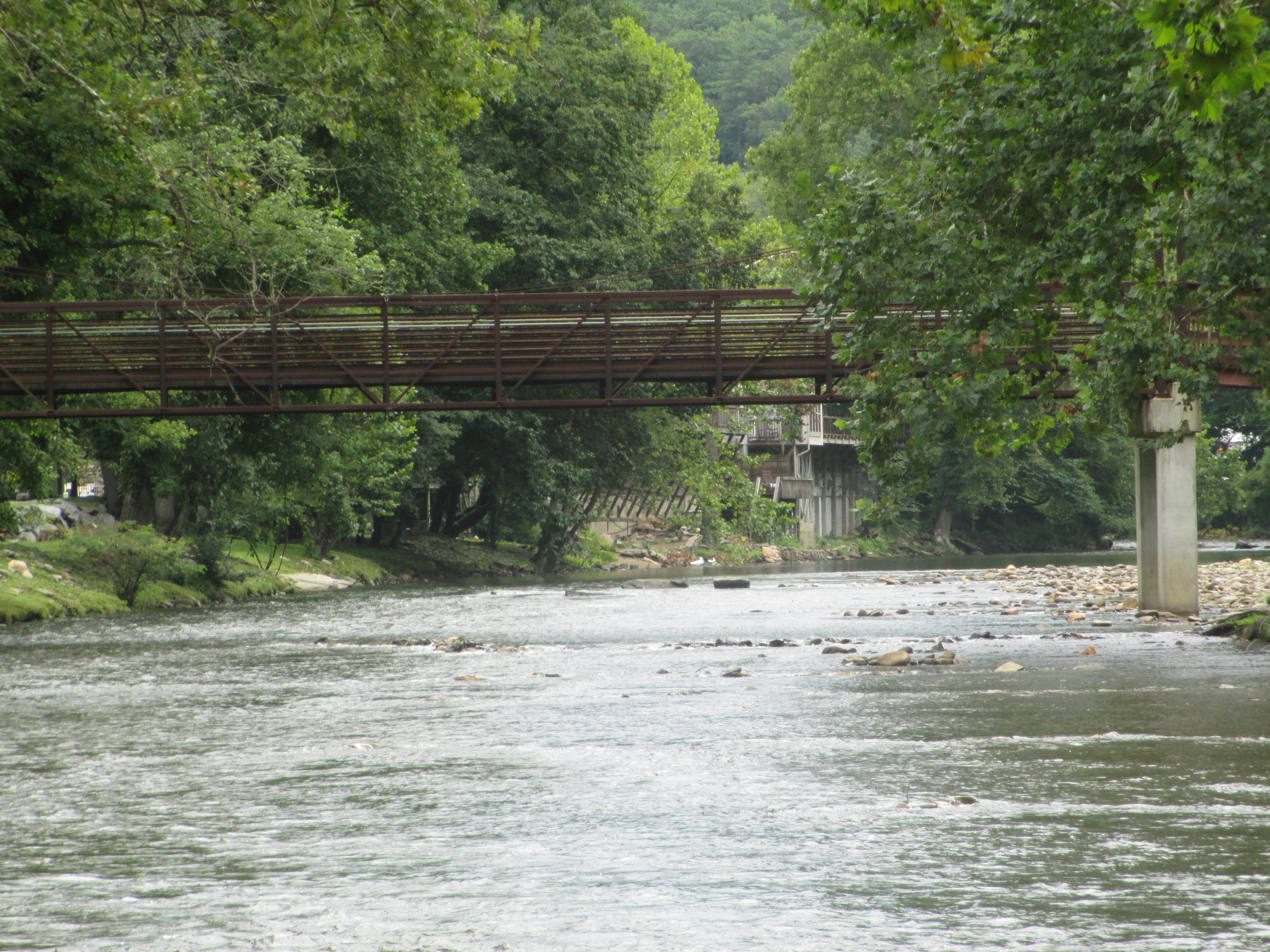
Walking bridge over the Oconaluftee River in Cherokee

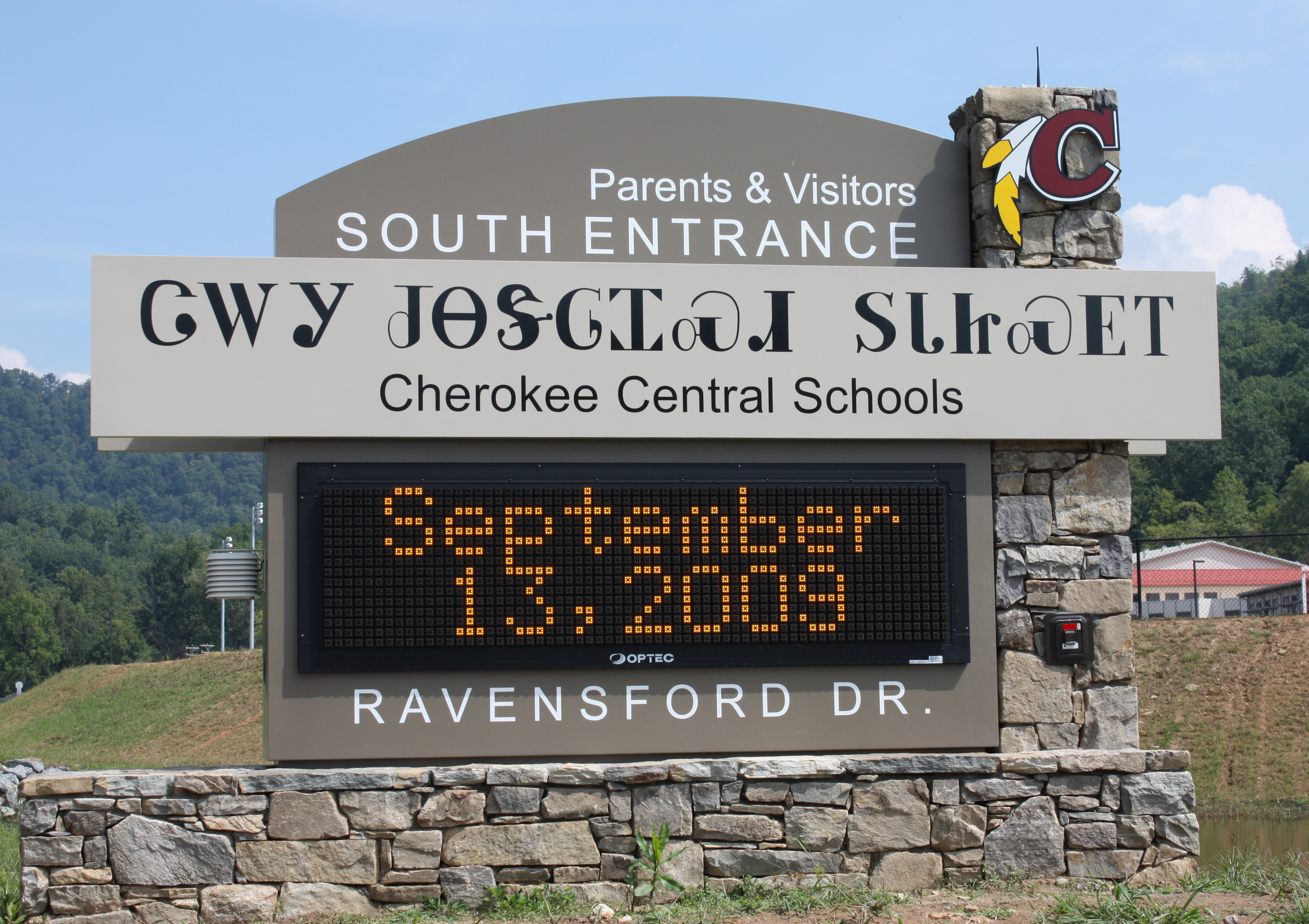
Cherokee Central Schools using Cherokee syllabary

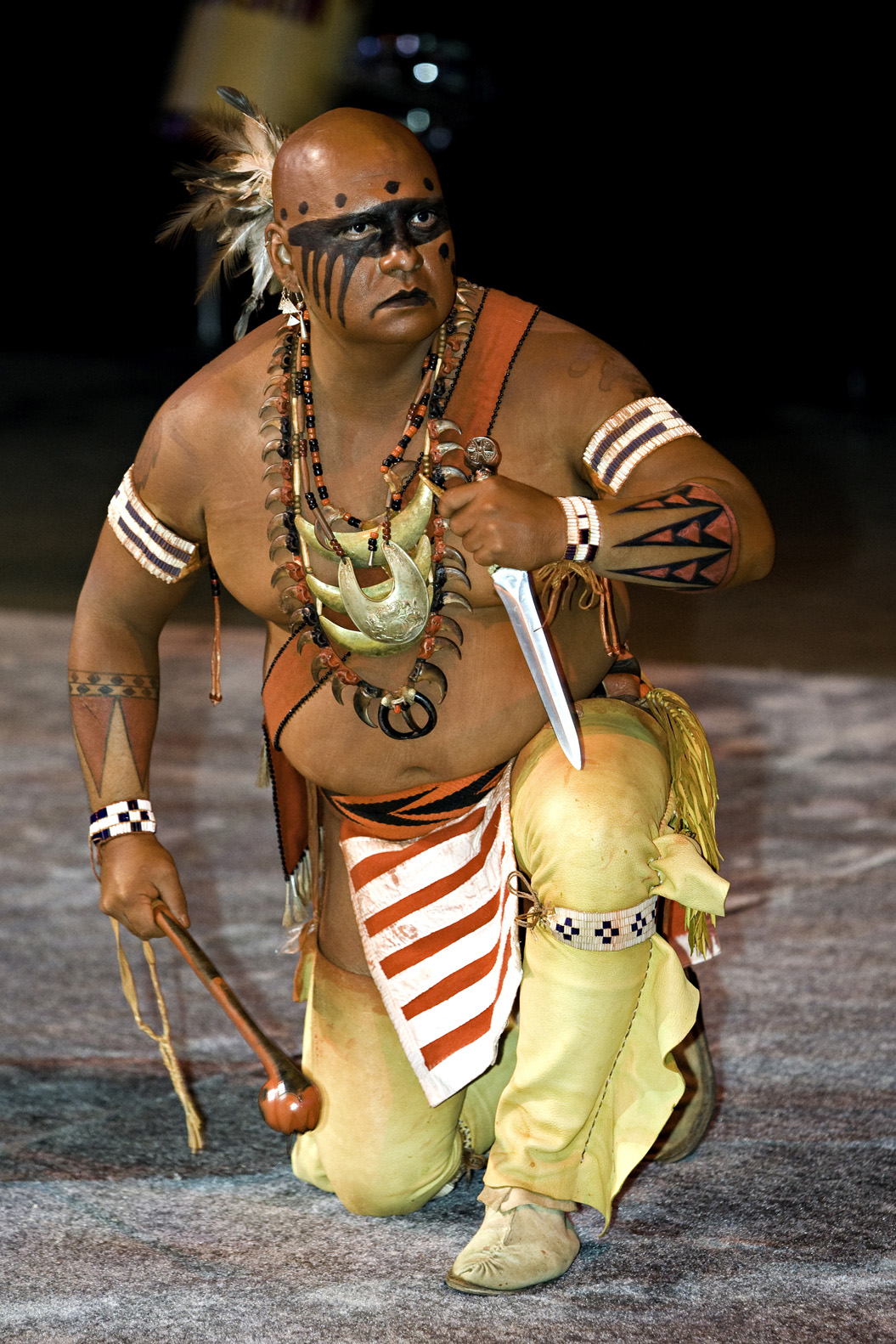
Member of the Warriors of AniKituhwa, a traditional Eastern Cherokee band dance troupe

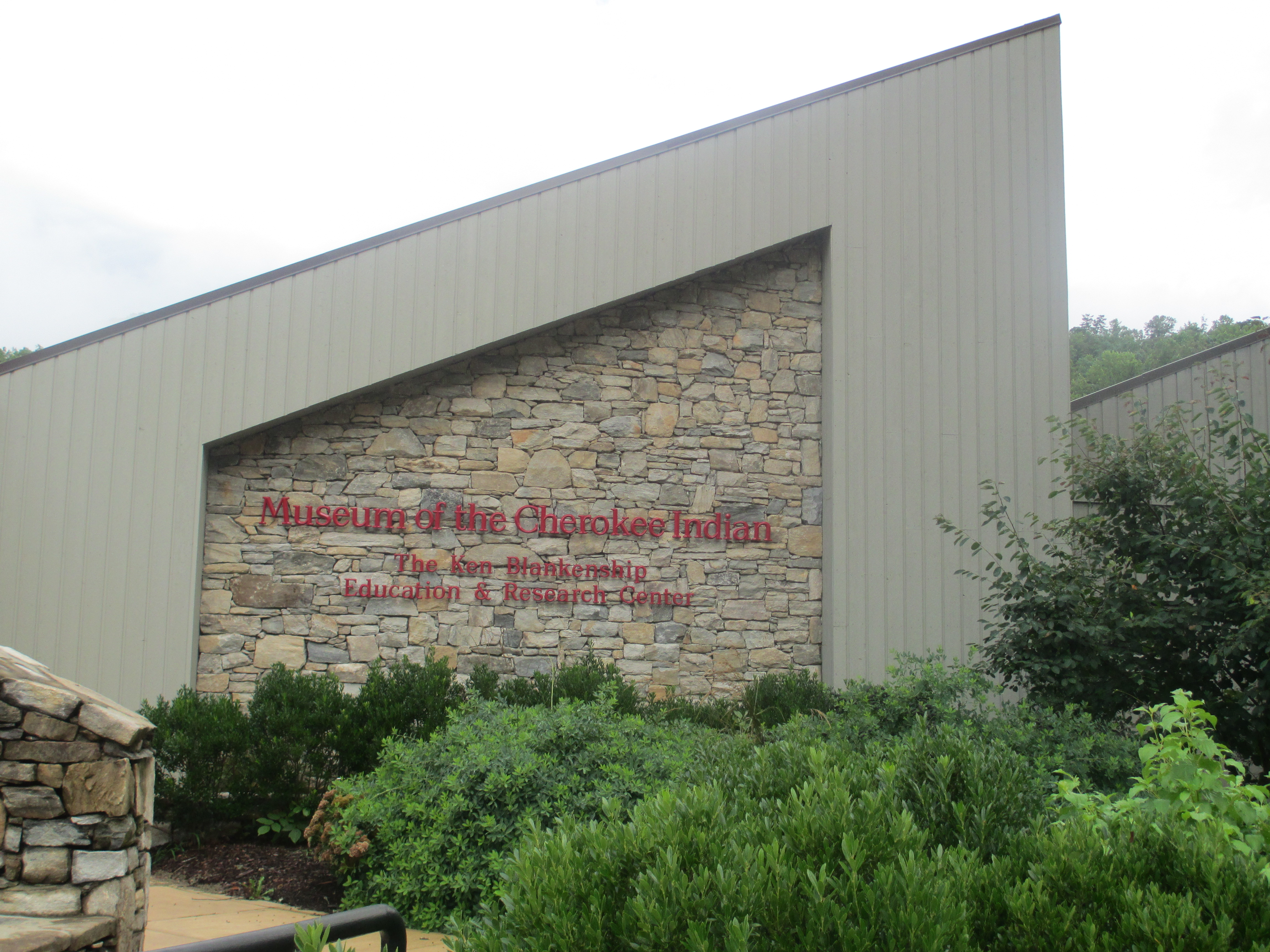
Museum of the Cherokee Indian on Tsali Boulevard in Cherokee

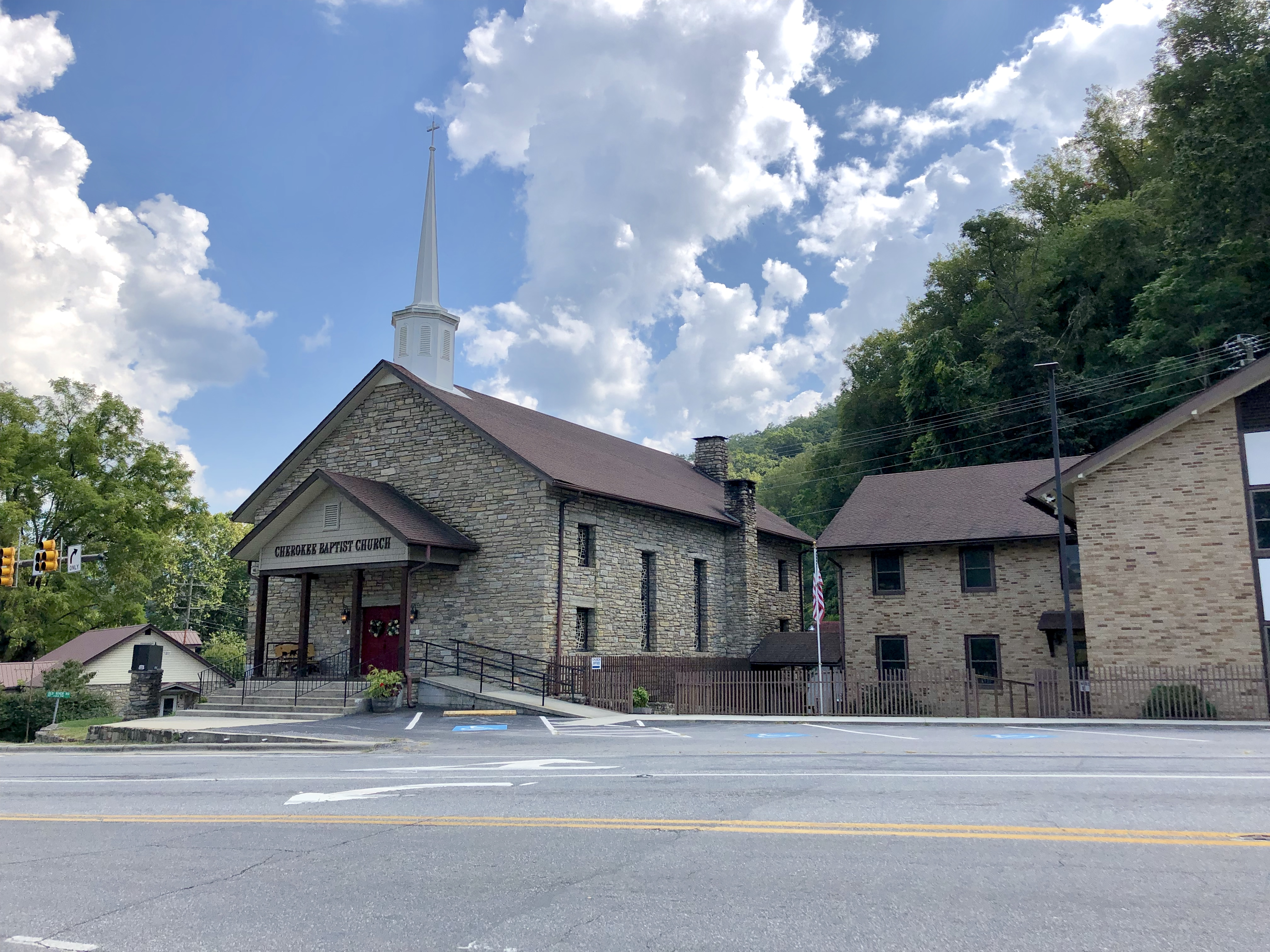
Cherokee Baptist Church
