= Myrtle Driver Johnson =

American Cherokee language expert

- Born: May 21, 1944 (age 81); Big Cove, North Carolina, U.S.
- Citizenship: Eastern Band Cherokee and U.S.
- Occupation: Translator
- Title: Beloved Woman

Myrtle Driver Johnson (born May 21, 1944) (Eastern Band of Cherokee Indians) is a native speaker of the Cherokee language. (Note: Specifically, Johnson's language expertise is representative of Kituwah (also known as the Middle or Eastern) dialect of Cherokee.) As of July 2019 she was one of 211 remaining Cherokee speakers in the Eastern Band of Cherokee Indians (EBCI).

In 2007, her tribe designated Johnson as a Beloved Woman for her translations from English into the endangered Cherokee language, support of language classes, and development of materials and literature for teaching.

== Language work ==
Johnson serves as the EBCI Tribal Council translator and has translated for the EBCI bilingual immersion school, New Kituwah Academy (NKA), since about 2006. For NKA, she translated the children's book Charlotte's Web, the first time the book had been translated into an indigenous American language. Johnson translated American author Charles Frazier's novel Thirteen Moons into Cherokee. It is loosely based on the life of William Holland Thomas, and explores the sociopolitical events related to Cherokee removal in 1839. The novel was published by the Museum of the Cherokee Indian press. She narrated her Cherokee translation of Thirteen Moons for the audio book. She also narrated Tsogadu Nvdo, a Cherokee-language audio book.

Johnson has been active with language and culture camps for children and speakers gatherings for adults. She has also participated in the quarterly Cherokee Language Consortium, a gathering of the three federally recognized tribes (Note: The three federally recognized Cherokee tribes are the Cherokee Nation (OK), the United Keetoowah Band of Cherokee Indians (OK), and the Eastern Band of Cherokee Indians (NC).) to standardize new terms in Cherokee.

== Views ==
Johnson was interviewed for the documentary First Language – The Race to Save Cherokee. She said (in comments translated into English) that "the children are learning to speak Cherokee, and I feel the Cherokee language is important because the government sees the Indians, but doesn't see them as Indians if they don't speak their own language".

Johnson toured the Cherokee Nation immersion school in Oklahoma before NKA was established. She was so moved by seeing a four-year-old read Cherokee words that she stepped out of the classroom to cry. In 2019, the Tri-Council of the three federally recognized Cherokee tribes declared a state of emergency with regard to the Cherokee language. This declaration included a resolution to work together on language revitalization, prompting Johnson to say "when they signed it, they made an agreement with us. They're going to help us. I'm not going to let them forget it."

== Honors ==
The Beloved Woman honor, which is rarely given and the highest a member of the EBCI can receive, was given to Johnson in 2007.

== Family ==
Johnson's two daughters, Myrna Climbingbear and Renissa McLaughlin, have worked with her on language revitalization. Renissa McLaughlin, also known as Renissa Walker, has managed the Kituwah Preservation and Education Program of the Cherokee Preservation Foundation, overseeing NKA. Myrna Climbingbear died at age 56 in June 2018 from cancer.

== See also ==
- Jeremiah Wolfe
- Amanda Swimmer
