= Eastern Band of Cherokee Indians Educational Policies =

The Eastern Band of Cherokee Indians educational policies have shaped the scholastic opportunities afforded to its members. The decision of the Eastern Band of Cherokee Indians (EBCI) to take control of the schools located on the Qualla Boundary under the Tribally Controlled Schools Act of 1987 started a wave of tribal responsibility in education. EBCI tribal council began producing programs that aided its members in most all aspects of the educational process. The evolution of these programs, their financing, and their relationship with tribal members and non-members alike are in a constant state of flux dependent upon policies produced by the EBCI tribal council. The EBCI tribal council does not directory set educational policy, although some if its members do set on boards that govern the educational facilities, and in most cases the director of the educational programs do report to the tribal council throughout the year. The policies of the EBCI educational programs can be analyzed through their respective goals, objectives, and procedures.

== Overview of educational history ==
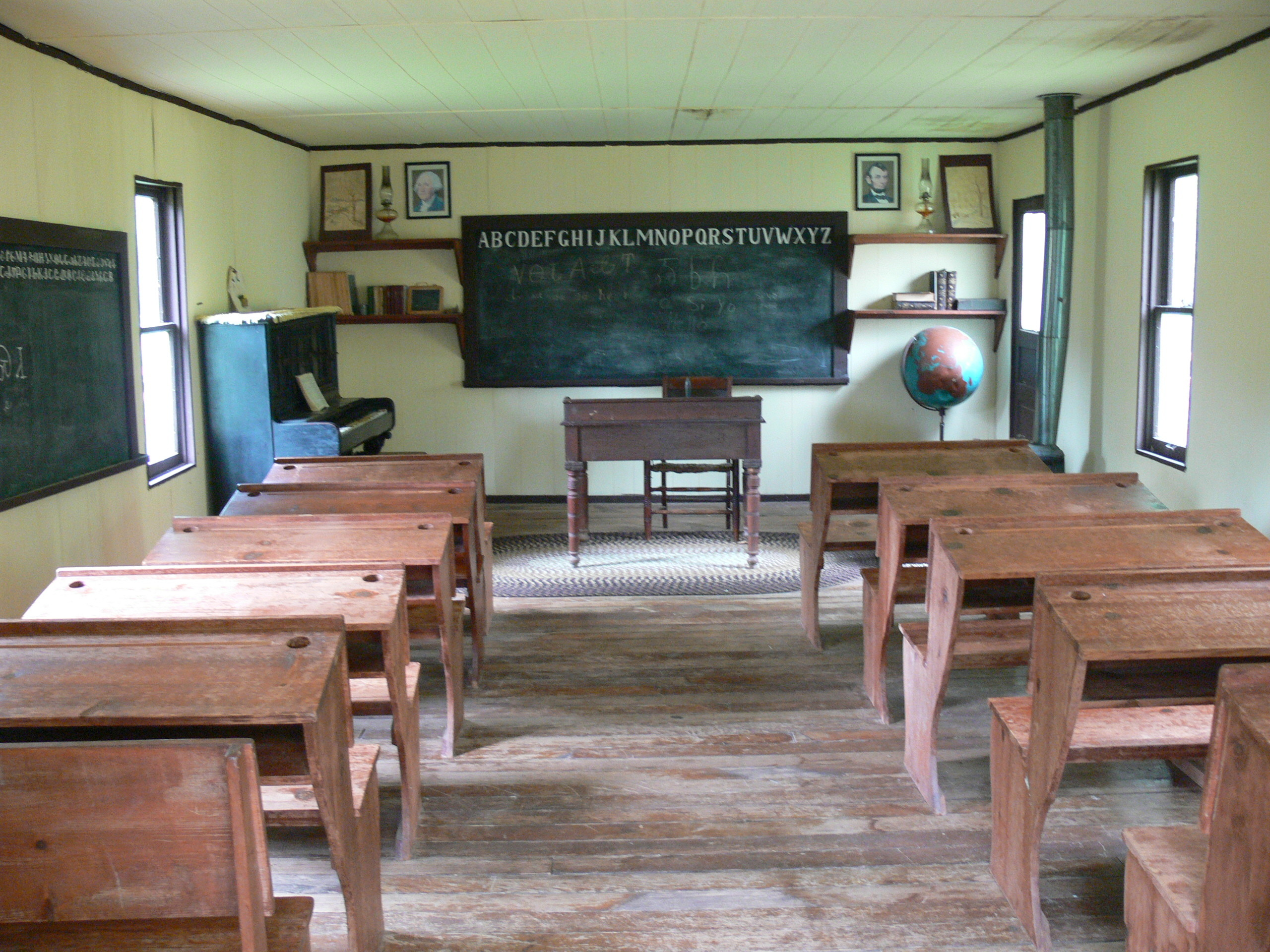
Cherokee Heritage Center

Cherokees first began to receive formal education around 1804 from missionary groups in northern Georgia. During the Cherokees forced removal to Oklahoma in 1838 education became virtually non-existent. For the remaining Cherokees in Western North Carolina education was provided by the Quakers through contract until the late 1800s. The Eastern Band of Cherokee Indians gained federal recognition by the U.S. Congress in 1868 and North Carolina state recognition just a few years prior. In 1890 the Bureau of Indian Affairs then known as the U.S. Indian Service provided boarding schools throughout Cherokee. The boarding schools became Cherokee day school in 1954 and in 1962 these community day schools were closed with the opening of a central elementary school. The Eastern Band of Cherokee Indians[EBCI] schools first became tribally controlled in 1990 with congresses enactment of the Tribally Controlled Schools Act of 1988. The U.S. Congress contended that "self-determination is dependent on an educational process that develops qualified people to fulfill meaningful leadership roles. Since that time the EBCI have been very supportive in cultivating education. The EBCI Tribal Council has incorporated the funding of many of the tribal educational facilities into the Cherokee Code (the EBCI's Governing Document), and worked diligently to supply support for many others. The EBCI Tribal Council along with the Cherokee Preservation Foundation have supported and fostered independent schools such as the Kituwah Preservation & Education Program or KPEP, whose main focus is the revitalization of the Cherokee language. The EBCI also created the Higher Education and Training department within the Community Education & Recreation Services Division to foster secondary education for Eastern Band of Cherokee Indian students.

== Current programs ==
=== Qualla Boundary Head Start ===
The Qualla Boundary Head Start (QBHS) consists of Head Start and Early Head Start programs located on the Qualla Boundary of Cherokee North Carolina. Head Start is a Federal program for preschool children from low-income families. The funding sources for the QBHS program include Federal, State, and Tribal funds. QBHS is a program initiative of the Cherokee Tribal Child Care Services division.

The Cherokee Tribal Child Care Service division's philosophies are;

- Children share certain basic need and that it is their right to have all these needs met.
- Children benefit most from a comprehensive program, which provides a broad range of services, and that the child's entire family, as well as the community, must be involved.
- That the program will strive to maximize the strengths and unique culture of each child and his/her family in an effort to help him/her to develop into a socially competent, productive member of society.

The QBHS/EHS program has 250 children enrolled in two different locations; the Dora Reed Children's Center, and the Big Cove center. 87% of the children participating in the program are enrolled members of the Eastern Band of Cherokee Indians. Prior to 1967 there were a series of child service programs around the Qualla Boundary located in each township. All of these except for Snowbird and Big Cove centers were merged to form the QBHS/EHS program. Currently the Dora Reed Children's Center provides services to infants and toddlers through the Head Start and Early Head Start. The Big Cove Center, however, only provides for Head Start ages 3–5 year old. The EHS program serves pregnant women, and provides for campus as well as home based care. The EHS program, as of 2012, has 70 slots available annually.

The Early Head Start/ Head Start Goals & Objectives are;

- Deliver a program that will enhance the physical, social/emotional, and cognitive development of all children enrolled at CTCCS.
- Maintain a comprehensive program, providing services to children, families and the Cherokee Community.
- Promote Health and safety to children, families, and staff.
- Direct the entire program operations of CTCCs.
- Maintain all fiscal functions for CTCCS within established policies and procedures of the EBCI.

The QBHS/EHS is currently directed by Natalie Case and is governed by her and a policy board constructed of parents and two Tribal Council members. Along with maintaining annual state compliance and completing federal reviews, QBHS/EHS also report to Tribal Council as to its progress throughout a given year.

=== Kituwah Preservation and Education Program ===
Formed in 2006, Kituwah Preservation & Education Program (KPEP) focus on language immersion programs for children from birth to fifth grade, developing cultural resources for general public, and community language programs to foster the Cherokee language among adults. Section 16C-21 of the Cherokee Code provides for the structure and financing of the Kituwah Language Immersion Fund. An allotment of .60% of the total gaming revenue received by the EBCI Tribal Government is placed aside for the Kituwah initiative. KPEP, in its efforts to further the language, has formed the Kituwah Language Revitalization Initiative. The purpose of this program is to improve the overall quality of life for Eastern Band of Cherokee members through increased fluency and cultural awareness by garnering community support, developing language programs for all community members, as well as reestablishing a public life for the language in which Cherokee is commonly heard and spoken.

The total immersion language programs are the lifeblood of the Kituwah language initiative. —Renissa Walker, Manager of KPEP

Culture is the context. Language is the medium. Immersion is the method" Renissa Walker

Currently there are two total immersion programs; early childhood education and elementary education. Five preschool classrooms are dedicated to educating children ages two to five years old, which accounts for 24 students currently. In 2010 the New Kituwah Academy became an independent of the Cherokee Central Schools of which it was a satellite the previous year. All students that attend the New Kituwah Academy are enrolled members of the EBCI. The school currently has a four-star license through the North Carolina Department of Child Development. Student who attend the school learn all the same curriculum material that students in other schools learn, the only difference is that the instruction at the New Kituwah Academy is in the Cherokee language. The elementary portion of the academy is guided by the North Carolina standard course of study and the No Child Left Behind Act. This is primarily accomplished by pairing teachers and fluent speakers within each classroom. Understanding the need to be bi-literate, and to score well on standardized testing, the academy teaches English language arts at the end of each school day.}

To provide feed back to KPEP, the Cherokee Preservation Foundation (the Schools largest granting agency) concluded by saying this, "The Cherokee Language Revitalization initiative of the EBCI is not only unique, it is exceptional. It is to date, in the experience of this consultant incomparable to other tribal efforts. Acknowledgment needs to be give to the stakeholders themselves, all of whom are brilliant, courageous, passionate and committed people. The finding of the assessment can only improve what has been an outstanding tribal endeavor."

Atse Kituwah (New Kituwah) Academy "Where the fire is being rebuilt"* In 2008, to build on the success of the preschool immersion program a new 7 million dollar state of the art school was built in Cherokee to serve as the heart of language revitalization. Atse Kituwah has become the home of the language immersion programs as well as the community cultural and language activates. The building hold both immersion programs as well as providing community spaces, adult language classes, and serves as a language and cultural campus for the EBCI.

=== Graham County Indian Education Program ===
The Graham County Indian Education Program is located within the Graham County School system, and is funded by the Eastern Band of Cherokee Indians and Title VII. A form of the program has been active since the nineteen seventies to work in tandem with the Graham County School system to enhance education through culturally relevant techniques. It services the school system as well as the Eastern Band of Cherokee Indian members locate in Snowbird, North Carolina, which is located about 45 minutes from the Qualla Boundary in Cherokee, NC. The program services an estimated 200 students pre-kindergarten through High School. The program works as a liaison between the community, school, tribal programs, and the home to support children in their pursuit of goals. The GCIE program consist of a manager, three tutors, one title VII tutor, a Cherokee History teacher and two Cherokee Language teachers. Together these individuals strive to accomplish one vision;

That every American Indian student will graduate from an academically rigorous and culturally relevant high school as a well-prepared lifelong learner globally competitive for work and postsecondary education.

The manager works alongside the Parent Committee (a board of parents and school representatives) to address issues, concerns, and address opportunities for improvement. The GCIE mission is to "foster an environment which provides educational experiences and cultural opportunities that promote high expectation and accountability for the academic achievement of American Indian students, thus preparing them for a globally competitive environment."

=== Cherokee Central School ===
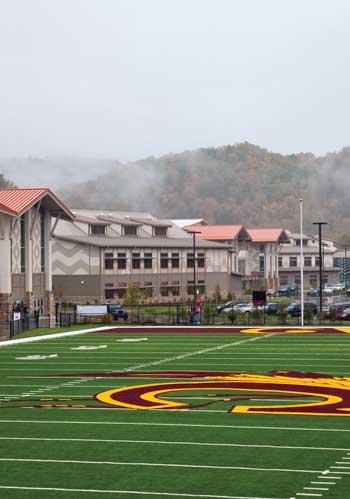
A view from the Football Field at Cherokee Central School in Cherokee North Carolina..

Cherokee Central Schools (Cherokee: ᏣᎳᎩ ᎫᎾᏕᎶᏆᏍᏗ ᏚᏓᏥᏍᎬᎢ) located in Cherokee, North Carolina is a conglomeration of the Cherokee Elementary School (Kindergarten – 5th Grade), Cherokee Middle School (6th Grade – 8th Grade), and Cherokee High School (9th Grade-12th Grade). In 2009 the central schools opened their new campus on the (recently reclaimed) Ravensford tract of land in the Big Cove community.

The Cherokee Central Schools are operated by the Eastern Band of Cherokee Indians under the Tribally Controlled Schools Act of 1988. Section 16C-18 of the Cherokee Code allots 2.00% of the total gaming revenue received by the EBCI Tribal Government to provide financial support to the Cherokee Central Schools. The formation of system policies and procedures falls upon the Cherokee School Board. The Cherokee School Board consists of elected members from the surrounding six communities of; Big Cove, Wolf Town, Paint Town, Bird Town, Yellow Hill, and Big Y. The board oversees the implementation of any enacted policies and procedures. They are also responsible for approving the system budget, as well as, insuring that all Federal, State, and Southern Association of Colleges and Schools (SACS) accreditation standards are fulfilled. The Board also has a representative of the EBCI Tribal Council serve as a member to act as a liaison between the two. The Goal of the Cherokee Central Schools are to:

Empower Our Students, Preserve Our Nation, and Ensure Our Future.

=== Higher Education and Training ===
The Higher Education and Training Department falls under the EBCI's Community Education & Recreation Services Division. Section 16C-16 of the Cherokee Code provides for the structure and financing of the Higher Education and Training Department. The Cherokee Code allows for the Higher Education Department to receive an allotment of 2.40% of the total gaming revenue received by the EBCI Tribal Government and generated through the use of Harrah's Cherokee Casino. The Cherokee Code also specifies what the funds are to be used for by the Higher Education Department. It provides for education such as classes needed to be accepted by a college, as well as, classes at college, graduate, and professional schools. The mission statement of the Higher Educations Department states:

The Education Program will give highest priority to all enrolled members of the Eastern Band of Cherokee Indians with access to financial assistance in his/her pursuits of a post-secondary education for future economic prosperity.

== Bibliography ==
- Eastern Band of Cherokee Indians Website (2013, 1 1). Education. Retrieved 2 4, 2013, from nc-Cherokee.com: http://nc-cherokee.com/education/—Dale%5B%5D Robinson 18:45, 4 February 2013 (UTC)
- http://www.njo.bie.edu/01_documents/PublicLaw100-297.pdf
- http://uncpress.unc.edu/nc_encyclopedia/cherokee.html
