= Rowena Bradley =

Native American basket weaver

- Born: December 16, 1922; Painttown, North Carolina, U.S.
- Died: January 7, 2003 (aged 80); Cherokee, North Carolina, U.S.
- Citizenship: Eastern Band Cherokee, American
- Occupation: Basket making

Rowena Bradley (1922–2003) was an Eastern Band Cherokee basket maker from the United States. Bradley's work has been exhibited at Qualla Arts and Crafts Mutual in Cherokee, North Carolina.

== Early life and education ==
Rowena Bradley was born in 1922 to Nancy George Bradley and Henry Bradley, and was the youngest of eight children. She grew up on the Painttown community's Swimmer Branch on the Qualla Boundary. She is listed on the Baker Roll.

Rowena created her first basket at the age of six. She learned weaving by observing her mother and her grandmother Mary Dobson (Tahtahyeh, b. ca. 1857), who were both accomplished basket makers. While neither her mother or her grandmother spoke English, they sold their baskets outside the Qualla Boundary area, including Washington, D.C., and New York.

Bradley was also a student of basket maker Lottie Queen Stamper, who taught basketmaking at the Cherokee boarding school.

== Method ==
Bradley crafted baskets from rivercane and was one of few Eastern Band Cherokee weavers with knowledge of a double-weave technique, which she learned from her mother Nancy Bradley. She quartered, peeled, and scraped the rivercane with a pocketknife. The dye materials she used were derived from local bark and roots such as butternut, black walnut and bloodroot. She wove patterns that she learned from her mother and also made her own designs. Her favored designs are now known as Peace Pipe, Double Peace Pipe, and Chief's Daughter.

Journalist John Parris described the process Bradley used in weaving, "working from memory, she forms the strips into patterns and then into baskets of all shapes and sizes. Early in the process of a double-weave pattern, literally scores of withes seem to fly out in all directions." Bradley devised new types of baskets, including a Purse Basket for sales to tourists.

== Recognition ==
In 1974, Bradley had a solo exhibition at the Qualla Arts and Crafts Mutual in Cherokee, North Carolina. The exhibition was partially funded by the North Carolina Arts Council and the Indian Arts and Crafts Board. She was recognized as "one of the foremost masters of rivercane basketry and one [of] the most talented, creative basketmakers in the United States." Stephen Richmond wrote that Bradley's work was a "new dimension of technical and aesthetic achievement."
