= Eva Wolfe =

Cherokee basket weaver from North Carolina

- Born: July 24, 1922; Soco, North Carolina, U.S.
- Died: February 6, 2004 (aged 81); Cherokee, North Carolina, U.S.
- Citizenship: Eastern Band Cherokee and U.S.
- Occupation: Basket maker
- Awards: Brown-Hudson Folklore Award (1988); NC Heritage Award (1989)

Eva Wolfe (July 24, 1922 – February 6, 2004) was an accomplished basket maker from North Carolina. Wolfe was known for weaving rivercane baskets, a traditional type of Cherokee basketry. She earned special distinction for her accomplishments in doubleweave basketry, a difficult plaited basket weaving technique. She was honored with a number of awards for her achievements as an artist, including the Brown-Hudson Folklore Award from the North Carolina Folklore Society in 1988 and the North Carolina Heritage Award in 1989.

== Biography ==
Eva Wolfe (née Awee Queen), was born in the Soco community of the Qualla Indian Reservation. She learned the craft of basket weaving at a young age from her mother, and later studied with her aunt Lottie Queen Stamper, a noted Cherokee basket weaving instructor. According to an interview with Mollie Blankenship, when Wolfe "realized that there were only two older basket weavers who could do rivercane double weave baskets," she decided to focus her energies on preserving this craft. She continued weaving baskets all her life, while raising eleven children on the Qualla Indian Reservation.

In order to weave her baskets, Wolfe and her husband Amble would travel 80 miles each April to find and cut suitable river cane. She would also gather bloodroot and butternut to dye her baskets. She would use a variety of knives to split each cane stalk into four strips to weave into baskets. The doubleweave basket technique requires the weaver to simultaneously weave one basket inside another, creating a flawless surface inside and out. Wolfe would work with as many as 120 cane splits at a time to make one basket, keeping them pliable by dipping frequently in water.

Wolfe's work was displayed at an exhibition organized by the Indian Arts and Crafts Board and Qualla Arts and Crafts Mutual, Inc. in 1969. In 1980, her work was part of an inaugural exhibition at the Appalachian Center for Crafts in Tennessee. In 1978, the National Endowment for the Arts awarded a grant for the creation of an exhibition of her work.

Wolfe won numerous awards for her artistry and craftsmanship. In 1968, her work placed first in an exhibition sponsored by the U.S. Department of the Interior. In 1988, she was awarded a Brown-Hudson Folklore Award from the North Carolina Folklore Society, and in 1989 she won the North Carolina Heritage Award.

== Death ==
Wolfe died on February 6, 2004, in Cherokee, North Carolina.
