= Jeremiah Wolfe =

Native-American awarded the title of "Beloved Man" by his tribe

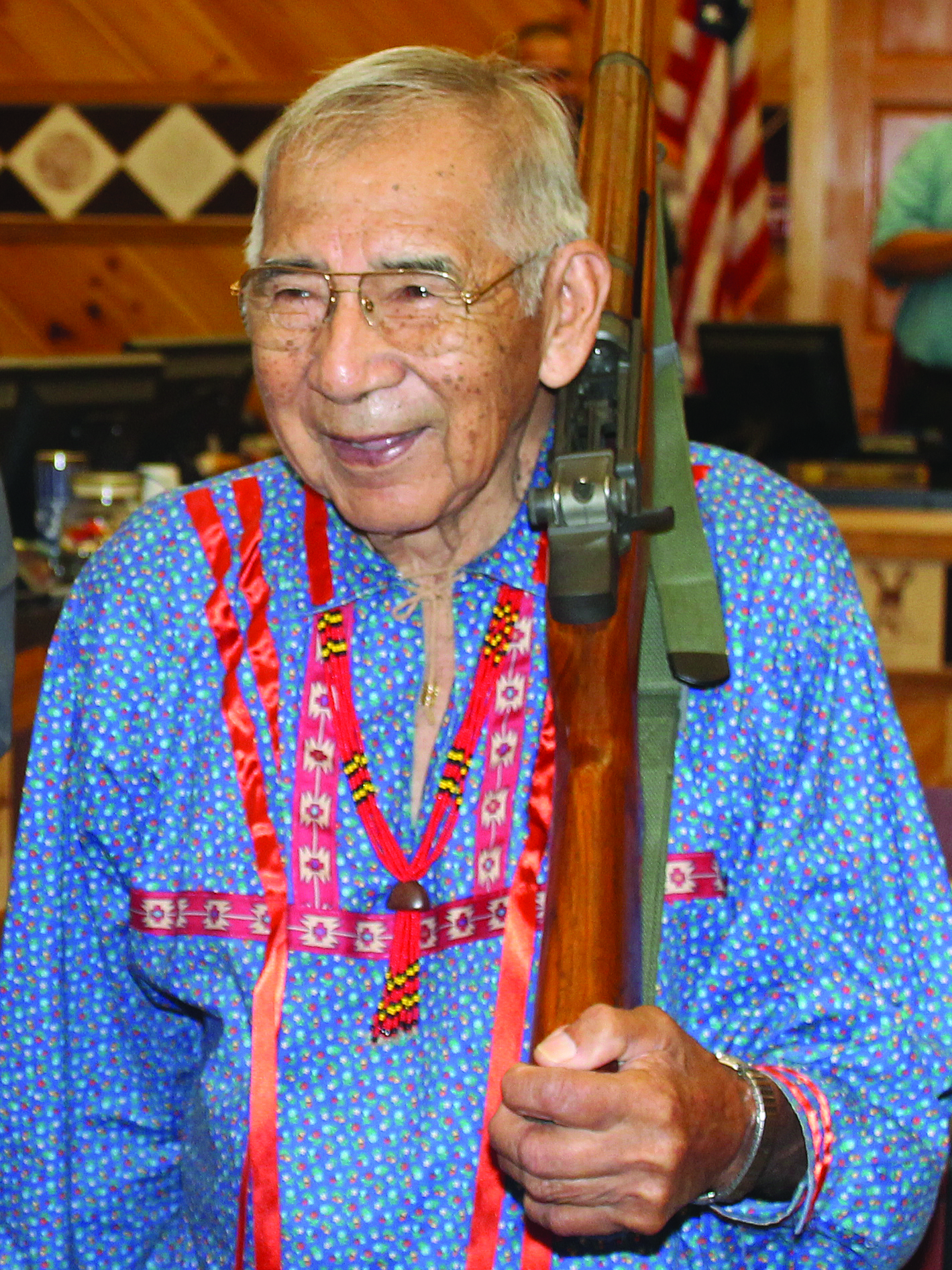
- Wolfe receiving the Patriot Award in 2013
- Born: September 28, 1924; Qualla Boundary, U.S.
- Died: March 12, 2018 (aged 93); Asheville, North Carolina, U.S.
- Citizenship: Eastern Band Cherokee and U.S.
- Occupations: Stone mason; Storyteller
- Title: Beloved Man
- Spouse: Juanita Wolfe
- Military service
- Allegiance: United States
- Branch: United States Navy
- Service years: 1943–1950
- Rank: Signalman 2nd Class
- Conflicts: World War II

Jeremiah "Jerry" Wolfe (September 28, 1924 – March 12, 2018) was a respected elder of the Eastern Band of Cherokee Indians. In 2013 he was awarded the title of "Beloved Man" by his tribe, an honor that had not been given out for more than 200 years.

Wolfe grew up in the Big Cove community on the Qualla Boundary in North Carolina. He was one of the last Cherokee stonecutters, a stickball caller, a storyteller, and a US Navy and World War II veteran. He was awarded an honorary doctorate by Western Carolina University. He was the recipient of The Order of the Long Leaf Pine in March 2017.

He was a fluent speaker of the Cherokee language and supported teaching it to young people to revive and preserve the language. In this role, he was interviewed for the documentary "First Language – The Race to Save Cherokee".

In July 2021, a segment of U.S. Route 441 (US 441), between US 74 and US 19, was named in his honor. He is a recipient of the Order of the Long Leaf Pine.

== Audio and video gallery ==
Video of Wolfe speaking in English and Cherokee at the Museum of the Cherokee Indian

Wolfe speaking the Kituwah dialect of Cherokee

== See also ==
- Amanda Swimmer
- Myrtle Driver Johnson
