= John Julius Wilnoty =

American sculptor (1940–2016)

- Born: April 10, 1940; Bigwitch, North Carolina, U.S.
- Died: June 7, 2016 (aged 76)
- Citizenship: Eastern Band Cherokee and American
- Occupation: Sculptor
- Spouse: Eleanor Littlejohn Wilnoty

John Julius Wilnoty (April 10, 1940 – June 7, 2016) was a renowned self-taught sculptor of the Eastern Band of Cherokee Indians. Wilnoty carved from wood, bone, and mainly steatite (soapstone). Wilnoty's carvings portray figures from Cherokee oral history. His work has been displayed in many exhibitions; And some works are in the Smithsonian collection. His sons (Fred Wilnoty and the late John Wilnoty Jr.) and grandson (Fred Wilnoty Jr.) also established themselves as carvers.

== Life ==
John Julius Wilnoty was born in the Big Witch community of the Eastern Band of Cherokee Indians reserve in North Carolina. His family later moved to Wolftown, also on the reserve. Wilnoty never completed his formal education. He was reading at a third grade level.

Wilnoty began carving when he was 20 years old. Wilnoty had narcolepsy and could not find steady work. Wilnoty said, "I did my praying about finding a way to make a living, I picked up some little pieces of pipe rock and carved faces on them. I took them to friends that sold crafts here in Cherokee. They bought the little pieces and sold them real soon; wasn't long I was making and selling a good many, I liked to do this." One of these friends was Tom Underwood of Medicine Man Crafts. Soon his art caught the attention of collectors nationally.

John Julius Wilnoty was married to Eleanor Littlejohn (1937 – October 11, 2001), a basket weaver. John Julius Wilnoty had four children, two became sculptors as well.

Wilnoty created works until the early 21st century. He retired from sculpting because of damage caused to his hands throughout his career, as a result of his narcolepsy.

== Death ==
John Julius Wilnoty died on June 7, 2016.

== Work ==
Wilnoty primarily worked in steatite, but he also carved from wood and bone. After carving his first several soapstone pendants, Tom Underwood encouraged Wilnoty to carve Cherokee pipes. Underwood and Wilnoty went to the Museum of the Cherokee Indian and Wilnoty said, "Well, I can make a better pipe than any of them." Wilnoty carved beautiful stone and wood pipes after this museum visit.

Wilnoty first created art centered around Pre-Columbian Cherokee mythology, which he was familiar with. By the seventies, Wilnoty was exploring the art of other tribal cultures. His sculptures often contain multiple figures intertwined in complex compositions. Wilnoty derived "great pleasure in 'hiding' smaller designs of birds and other animals within the figures of larger ones, (collectors) months later, upon closer inspection, find all kinds of tiny figures clearly visible within the feature of the work." Tom Underwood described this as a unique instinct that would elevate Wilnoty to the levels of Michelangelo. One of his more well known works is Eagle Dancer, a twenty-nine inch carved cherry wood sculpture. It is carved one of one piece, by following the grain of the wood.

Wilnoty's narcolepsy often affected his ability to carve. He would sometimes suddenly fall asleep and damage his hands. He was prescribed strong medication that was meant to keep him awake, but sometimes he would take extended breaks from the medication and retreat from life and art for prolonged periods of time.

Wilnoty's work has been included in many exhibitions, including the Smithsonian Institution. He had his first solo show in 1971 at the Qualla Arts and Crafts Mutual, where he displayed twenty-one sculptures on loan from the Indian Arts and Crafts Board, Qualla Arts and Crafts Mutual, Burgess Indian Museum, and the Medicine Man Craft Shop. The show was organized by the Indian Arts and Crafts Board, an agency within the Department of the Interior. Wilnoty and his wife were members of the Qualla Arts and Crafts Mutual from 1971 onward. In 1972 he had a second solo exhibit at the Norton Simon Museum (formerly the Pasadena Art Museum) in Pasadena, California, which included twenty-five soapstone pieces from a private collection in San Jose. The Smithsonian Collection holds eleven of Wilnoty's pieces in their permanent collection.
