= Cherokee One Feather =

Newspaper

The Cherokee One Feather
- Editor: Robert Jumper
- Founded: 1967; 58 years ago
- Language: English
- Website: theonefeather.com

The Cherokee One Feather is an English language newspaper in North Carolina published on the Qualla Boundary of the Eastern Band of Cherokee Indians in Cherokee, North Carolina. It has been published since at least 1967. Robert Jumper is its editor. It covers news, sports, arts, culture, community views, and tribal government activities relevant to the EBCI and the broader Indian Country.

The paper has received awards for its work.

The paper has covered events promoting the tribes' cultural identity.

Margaret Bender wrote about the paper noting its popularity in the community and influential role in North Carolina's Cherokee community.

== See also ==
- Eastern Band of Cherokee Indians
