= Maggie Axe Wachacha =

Cherokee cultural leader (1892–1993)

- Born: Maggie Axe; September 16, 1894; Snowbird Gap, North Carolina, U.S.
- Died: February 3, 1993 (aged 98); Murphy, North Carolina, U.S.
- Citizenship: Eastern Band Cherokee, American
- Occupations: Clerk; Herbalist; Midwife; Public speaker; Translator
- Known for: Revitalization of Cherokee Culture
- Title: Beloved Woman
- Spouse: Jarrett Wachacha
- Children: Winona Wachacha
- Parent(s): Will and Caroline Cornsilk Axe
- Awards: Distinguished Women of North Carolina (1986)

Maggie Axe Wachacha (1892–1993) (Eastern Band of Cherokee) was renowned for reinvigorating Cherokee culture and for her work in ethnobotany.

== Early life ==
Maggie Axe was born and raised in Snowbird Gap in Graham County, North Carolina, the daughter of Will and Caroline Cornsilk Axe. Her family home was rather isolated from the majority of Cherokee in the region, most of whom lived about 50 miles away in the Qualla Boundary of Swain County. In her youth, European Americans made many efforts to assimilate Cherokee people into mainstream culture. For instance, she attended Christian church every Sunday, where she learned that "the mountains and the valleys were not formed by the Great buzzards wings but by God." Wachacha liked learning about the Bible, the stories in it, and Jesus, but she still felt connected to traditional Cherokee culture. Cherokee was her first language when she was growing up. Wachacha reportedly taught herself to read and write in Cherokee at the age of seven, using chalk and writing in the dirt. She attended an English-speaking school for four months a year until she reached the fourth grade. According to anthropologist Sharlotte Nealy, the Cherokee and other tribes were forced to have their children attend boarding schools dominated by European-American teachers, whose goal was to assimilate them to mainstream culture.

Wachacha's grandson remembers Wachacha talking about her elders's experiences with the Trail of Tears. Not many Cherokee people wrote about this horrific journey; but the passage was kept alive in Cherokee historical memory through oral histories. Wachacha's ancestors were among the Cherokee who arranged to remain in Western North Carolina and avoid forced removal to Indian Territory.

== Career ==
Wachacha was a clerk for the Eastern Band of Cherokee Indians Tribal Council for nearly 50 years. She began this work in 1937. She appeared to leave behind no written work other than the official minutes she recorded. Wachacha spoke Cherokee, and there are conflicting accounts as to whether or not she spoke English fluently. Wachacha taught a Cherokee Indian class at Zion Hill Baptist Church. Along with teaching there, she taught Cherokee culture and language at the Robbinsville school system, Tri-County Technical College, and the Adult Education Program of Graham County.

Wachacha was known for her skills as a midwife, herbalist, translator, and public speaker. Over the course of working as a midwife, Wachacha helped deliver over 3,000 babies. To relieve pain, Wachacha would give mothers in labor tea from the inner bark of the wild black cherry. She regularly walked great distances to help any woman who needed her services.

As a Cherokee council member and Beloved Woman, Wachacha attended Cherokee singing ceremonies, wearing the customary red Cherokee woman's handkerchief. This event was the annual Trail of Tears Singing, which the Eastern Band of Cherokee Indians adopted from the Western Band of Cherokee Indians in Oklahoma. The Trail of Tears Singing was used to create solidarity between the Cherokee bands and foster ideals of Cherokee traits and identity.

== Beloved Woman ==
In Cherokee culture, a beloved woman is someone who has a lot of influence in the tribe, speaks in tribal meetings, and corresponds with Beloved Women from other indigenous nations. Wachacha was honored in 1978 as a Beloved Woman by the Eastern Band of Cherokee Indians and Cherokee Nation for her work as a clerk in the tribal council. She was the second woman to be honored in this way. She had received the North Carolina Distinguished Women Award from Governor Jim Martin in 1986. She was one of five to win the award of 91 nominated.

== Family ==
In 1935 Maggie met and married Jarrett Wachacha. Jarrett was 20 years older than Maggie, and he was a member of the Deer Clan. Maggie and Jarrett had their first child, Winona, in 1936.
