= David T. McCoy =

American politician and lawyer

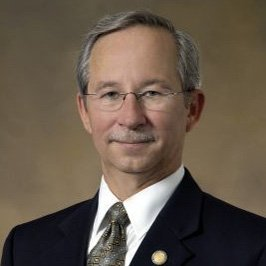

Personal details
- Born: David Timothy McCoy; August 27, 1952 (age 74) Tacoma, Washington
- Education: University of Georgia; University of North Carolina at Chapel Hill

David Timothy McCoy (born August 27, 1952) is an American Indian attorney and state public official in North Carolina. McCoy is a member of the Turtle Mountain Band of Chippewa Indians and was the first American Indian to serve in several roles in North Carolina state government, including State Controller, State Budget Director, and Secretary of the North Carolina Department of Transportation.

== Early life and education ==
McCoy was born in 1952 in Tacoma, Washington, the third of seven children. McCoy's stepfather served in the United States Army, and McCoy consequently spent much of his childhood in California, North Carolina, Georgia, and Germany.

McCoy attended the University of Georgia, graduating with a Bachelors of Science in Education in 1976 and a Master of Education in Educational Psychology in 1979. He then attended the University of North Carolina at Chapel Hill where he earned a Master of Public Health in 1982. As a student in Public Health, he served as co-chairperson of the Minority Student Caucus. In 1983, he attended the Pre-Law Summer Institute for American Indians at the University of New Mexico School of Law before returning to Chapel Hill to earn a Juris Doctor at the University of North Carolina School of Law. During law school, he continued to work for the School of Public Health as director of UNC's Master of Public Health Program for American Indians. McCoy was the first member of a federally recognized tribe to graduate from the University of North Carolina School of Law and was the founder of the UNC School of Law Native American Law Students Association. He has held an appointment as an Adjunct Associate Professor in the UNC Gillings School of Global Public Health since 1986.

== Political career ==
=== Commission of Indian Affairs ===
As Deputy Director of the Commission of Indian Affairs, McCoy worked to "improve the economy, the schools, and the quality of life for North Carolina's Native American citizens." In 1988, citizens were taken hostage at The Robesonian newspaper offices; McCoy was the initial negotiator with Native American hostage takers Eddie Hatcher and Timothy Jacobs and worked to de-escalate the hostage crisis. Following this incident, he worked to establish the Robeson County Dispute Resolution Center, a tri-racial initiative, in Lumberton, North Carolina.

In response to the Eastern Band of Cherokee Indians' request to engage in gaming activities in North Carolina under the Indian Gaming Regulatory Act, he was appointed by Governor James G. Martin and subsequently by Governor James B. Hunt Jr. as the State's lead liaison and chief negotiator for the gaming compact with the Eastern Band of Cherokee Indians. Following the adoption of the Compact, he served on the Cherokee Preservation Foundation Board of Directors from 2000 to 2013. McCoy later served as the Chief Counsel for the Department of Administration, of which the Commission of Indian Affairs is part.

=== Department of Transportation ===
McCoy was appointed Secretary of Transportation by Governor James B. Hunt Jr. in 1999. He was the first Native American to serve in this position. As Secretary, he served as the Chief Executive and Chairman of the Board of Transportation and was responsible for strategic planning and management of the department and its annual budget. McCoy oversaw the nation's second largest highway system as well as ferry service, mass transit, rail, aviation, and the Division of Motor Vehicles. McCoy managed the state's transportation response to several major disasters including Hurricane Floyd, where he worked closely with the Federal Emergency Management Agency and state and local agencies to ensure safe evacuations and reentry for North Carolina residents affected by the storm. During his tenure, he supported the creation Safe Roads for Safe Schools, Keep NC Clean and Beautiful, and ClickIt or Ticket.

=== Office of State Budget and Management (OSBM) ===
Governor Michael F. Easley appointed McCoy as State Budget Director where he served from 2001 to 2008. During this time, McCoy also served as Secretary to the Council of State and was responsible both for ensuring that the Council fulfilled its statutory responsibilities and for maintaining the official Council Journal for presentation to the General Assembly.

=== Office of the State Controller ===
McCoy served as North Carolina's State Controller from 2008 through 2014. While serving as State Controller, McCoy implemented a number of reforms within the Controller's Office and State Government. He worked with SAS Institute as an IT vendor partner to develop the award-winning Criminal Justice Law Enforcement Automated Data Services (CJLEADS) program. In addition, he oversaw the installation of a $100 million HR/Payroll system, including a data migration project that made available more than thirty years of position and employee human resources data previously located in the state's legacy human resources system. McCoy retired in 2014 from Office of the State Controller after twenty-seven years of service to North Carolina State government.

== Awards, honors, and memberships ==
- Order of the Long Leaf Pine
- Commissioned a Kentucky Colonel by Governor Ernie Fletcher
- Felix S. Cohen Hornbook Award for best paper, Federal Indian Law, American Indian Law Center

== Personal life ==
McCoy is an enrolled member of the Turtle Mountain Band of Chippewa Indians. He is married to Robin Bruce McCoy and has two children.
