= Lottie Queen Stamper =

Eastern Cherokee basket maker and educator

- Lottie Stamper in 1948
- Born: Lottie Queen; January 4, 1907; Soco, North Carolina, U.S.
- Died: 1987 (aged 79–80)
- Citizenship: Eastern Band Cherokee, American
- Occupation: Basket maker
- Years active: 1937–1966 (Teacher)
- Spouse: Bill Stamper
- Parent(s): Levi and Mary Queen
- Awards: Honorary lifetime membership in the Southern Highland Handicraft Guild (1952)

Lottie Queen Stamper (January 4, 1907 – 1987) was an Eastern Band Cherokee basket maker and educator.

== Early life and education ==
Lottie Queen was born at the Qualla Boundary, a member of the Eastern Band of Cherokee Indians. Her parents were Levi Queen and Mary Queen. Mary Queen taught all her children to weave baskets, and the family sold handmade white oak baskets to supplement their farming income.

== Career ==
Lottie Queen Stamper learned to rivercane and natural dyes in her weaving after she married into the Stamper family, which included several skilled weavers. She taught basket weaving to Cherokee school students and adult learners for almost thirty years, from 1937 to 1966. Among her students were her niece Eva Wolfe and Rowena Bradley. She learned and taught a rare double-weave basket technique. Stamper was a member of the Southern Highland Craft Guild, and in 1952 was the first Native American to win the guild's lifetime achievement award. In 1959, she also received a lifetime achievement award from the Department of the Interior, Indian Arts and Crafts Board.

== Death and legacy ==
Lottie Queen Stamper died in 1987, at the age of 80. Baskets by Stamper and her students were shown as part of "Transformations: Cherokee Baskets in the 20th Century" and exhibition at the Mountain Heritage Center in 2006. Work by Stamper also appeared in "The Story of North Carolina" at the North Carolina Museum of History in 2011.
