= Thirteen Moons =

2006 historical novel by Charles Frazier

- Author: Charles Frazier
- Language: English
- Publication date: 2006
- Publication place: United States

Thirteen Moons is a 2006 historical novel by American author Charles Frazier, his second book after the award-winning Cold Mountain. Set in the mid-nineteenth century, the novel is loosely based on the life of William Holland Thomas, a Confederate Army officer during the American Civil War and Principal Chief of the Eastern Band of Cherokee Indians—the only white man to ever hold that position. Thirteen Moons depicts the social and political climate preceding and following the Cherokee Removal from the ancestral homeland of the Cherokee Nation in what is today Western North Carolina.

== Plot summary ==
Near the end of his life, frontiersman Will Cooper reflects on his formative experiences from the unfamiliar comfort of his twentieth-century house. A call, which could be from Claire, the love of his past with whom he has lost contact, plunges him into memory, the recollection of which comprises, save for this prologue and a brief epilogue, the novel's entirety.

Will, as a twelve-year-old boy, is sold into indentured servitude, and in this capacity he travels alone to the edges of a growing United States of America and of the Cherokee Nation in order to manage a trading post. On the way to the trading post he suffers many misadventures and ends up losing his horse which is his only means of transportation. In tracking down his beloved horse "Waverley" he happens upon the formidable Featherstone (a renowned horse thief), whom Will beats at a game of chance which amounts to a large sum of money. Featherstone demands that Will give him a final chance to recoup all the money in a final hand against a girl that Featherstone claims to have many of. Will wins the girl and when he meets Claire, then aged 11, he instantly falls in love with her; however Featherstone is a bad loser and sends him running for his life into the wilderness. After some days of wandering Will stumbles upon the trading post. There, Will demonstrates, along with optimistic fatalism, an aptitude for entrepreneurship. He quickly learns to speak Cherokee, the language of many of his customers and he manages to communicate and trade with them. When he is sixteen the owner of the trading post dies and his son sells the business to Will. His financial success allows him to build a small library there.

He has been befriended by the local Cherokee chief named Bear who adopts him as a son and he is adopted into the tribe as well. Will meets Claire for the second time at a party Bear hosts when she is 16. He comes across Cranshaw, where Claire is part of Featherstone's household, presumably his daughter. We learn that Featherstone brazened out his sentence of forfeiture which should have taken place after he murdered a member of another tribal group. Will returns frequently to visit Claire and borrow books from Featherstone, who still has extra aces up his sleeves, but grudgingly accepts and eventually also adopts him. As the years go by, Will grows more and more attached to Claire and they consummate their affection after a long process of courtship, spending two romantic summers together. However, Will finds out that Claire is Featherstone's wife, not daughter, as she had been thrown into the deal when he married her older sister. Coupled with the fact that a white man can not legally marry a mixed blood in the state and Claire's insistence on 'all or nothing' they never become fully wed. He has also had a duel with Featherstone, who never seems able to leave Will's horse alone.

Will and his 'father' Bear have been conspiring to legally buy the land occupied by the Cherokee Nation. Will takes up their cause and lobbies at the nation's capitol, arguing for the tribe's legal land rights and for a while is partly successful at keeping a large portion of the land for his tribes exclusive use. He had somewhat become drugged by his legal reading into over-complexity in the transactions and the portion gets drastically reduced. Eventually, however, the army comes in, displaces almost the whole of the Cherokee nation and forces them to the plains beyond their traditional home in the coves cut from the mountains; Claire is forced to move away. He visits her sometime later, but she is unenthused at his visit and has since had a child with Featherstone. Featherstone tells Will that he died and came back to life, and is determined to make his second death one of much more phenomenal proportions.

Devastated by the loss of his love on top of the miseries his friends have suffered along the Trail of Tears, some self-conscious attempts to find another partner and finally the traumas he himself witnessed while fighting in the American Civil War, Will departs his only home and wanders the nation aimlessly.

Will's final encounter with Claire takes place at the Warm Springs Hotel, when both are in their fifties. Will hears talk of a Woman in Black who keeps herself aloof from the other hotel residents and remains in the mourning black from the death of her husband long past any necessary period. He comes across her one afternoon after being knife-cut by the collectors of someone to whom he owes money. She informs him that Featherstone's final death was hardly more dramatic than the first, and that her child has died as well. The pair spends another summer together, during which time Claire rejects a marriage proposal from Will and decides to leave him again. After more years, Will retires to a lonely home following a deal with the railroad built on a tract of land which he had owned. The novel ends in elegy for lost opportunities, the frontier spirit, and the memory of a native people.

== Cherokee Literature Initiative ==
Thirteen Moons was selected by the Cherokee Literature Initiative of the Museum of the Cherokee Indians as the first literary work to be translated into the Cherokee language and syllabary. The Initiative, which was established with a grant from Charles Frazier, aims at preserving the Cherokee language. Myrtle Driver Johnson served as the translator.

== Contract ==
Charles Frazier was given an advance payment of over $8 million for a proposal that became Thirteen Moons. The book had an initial print run of 750,000 copies, but sold only approximately half of them. It is estimated that Random House lost $5.5 million on the advance.
