= Ravensford Site =

Archaeological site in North Carolina, United States

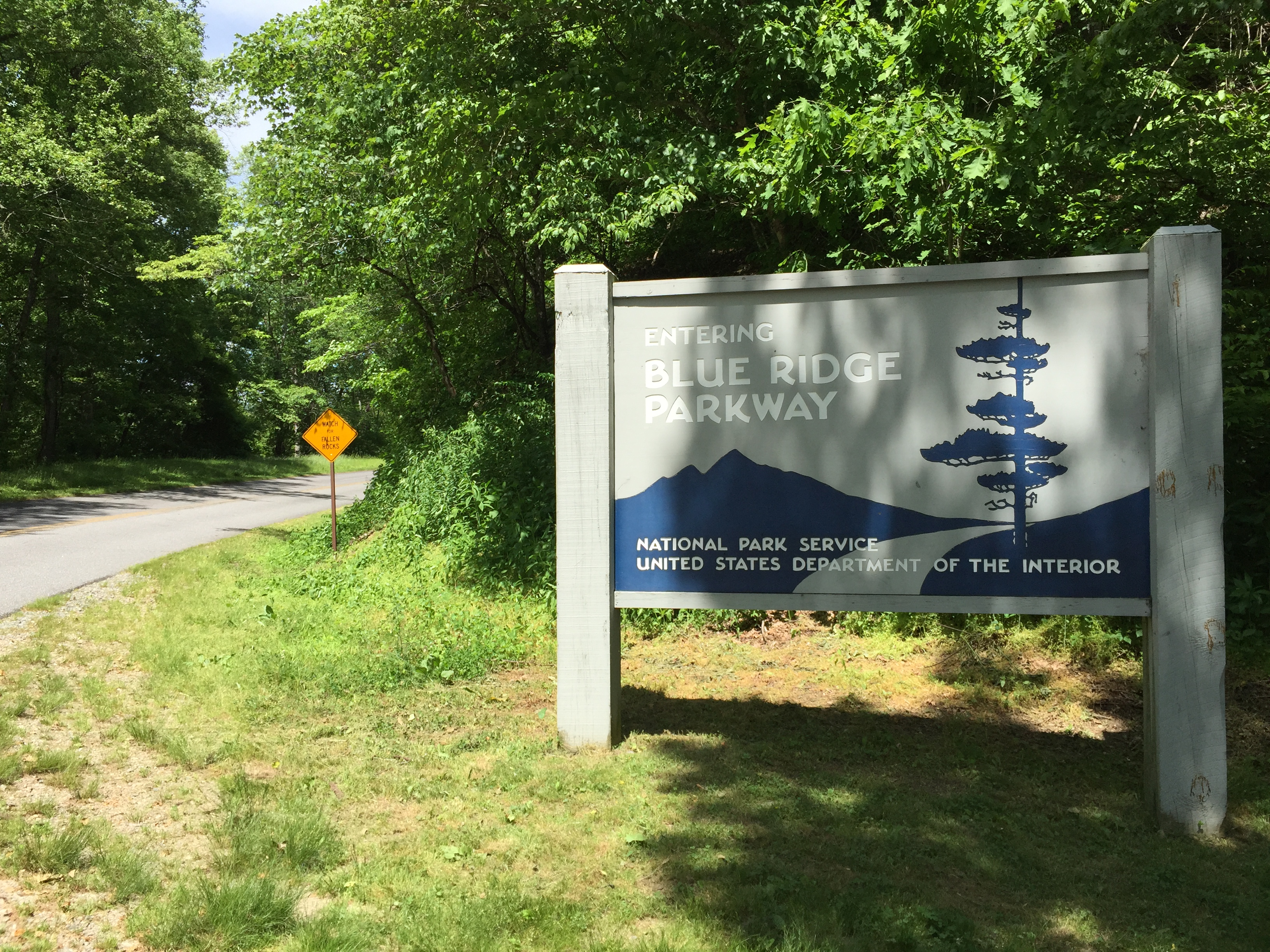
"Entering Blue Ridge Parkway" sign at the south end of the Blue Ridge Parkway heading northbound in Ravensford, Swain County, North Carolina

The Ravensford Site is an old archaeological site located in the state of North Carolina, specifically within modern-day Swain County of the Appalachian Summit Region. Slightly north of the town of Cherokee, it sits at the edge of Oconaluftee River along the Raven Fork tributary on the Qualla Boundary. Its current elevation is 2,012 feet.

== Ravensford Site history ==
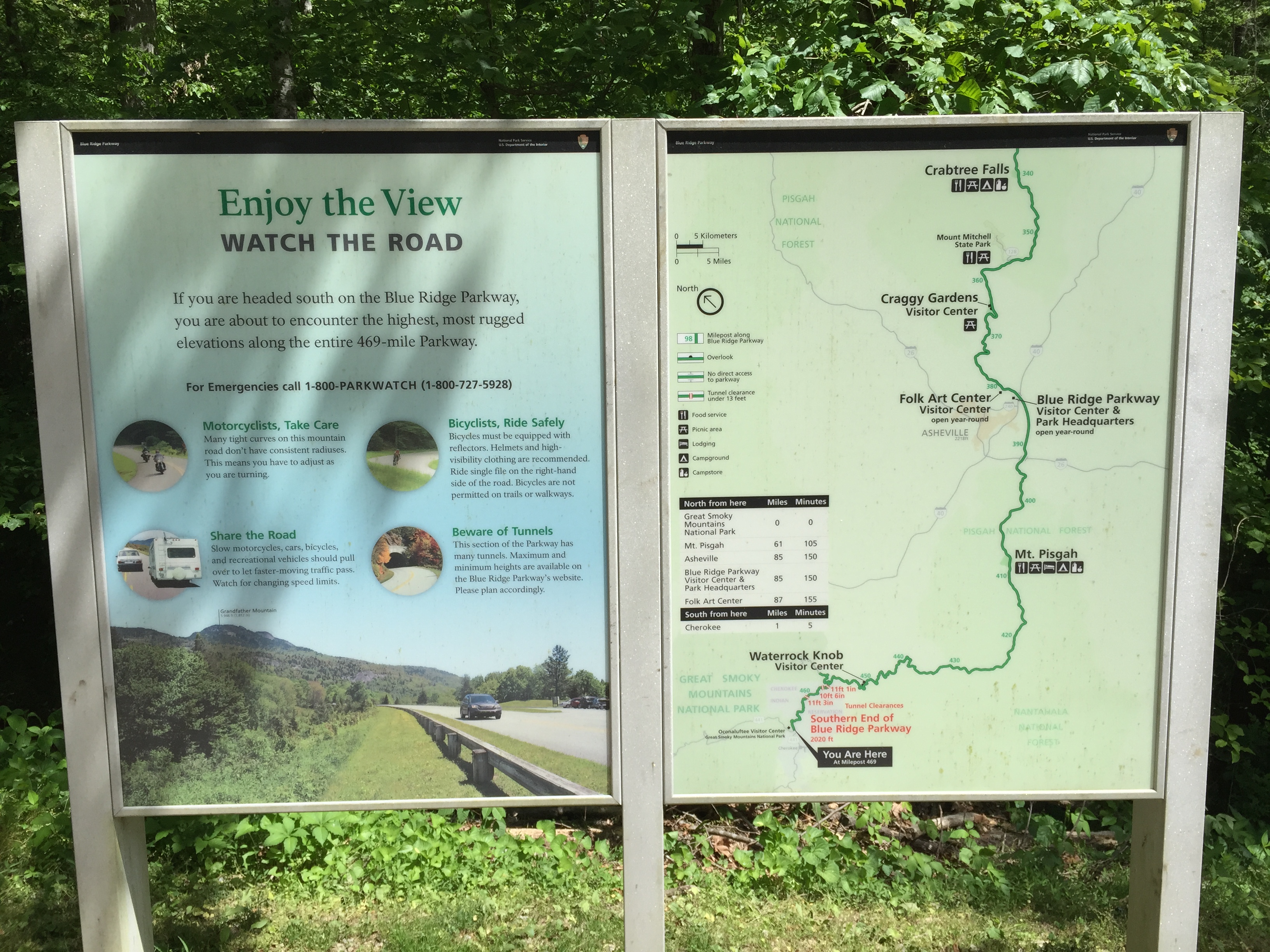
Sign describing the Blue Ridge Parkway at the south end of the Blue Ridge Parkway in Ravensford, Swain County, North Carolina

=== Cherokee land exchange ===
Beginning as a quaint factory town in the early decade of the 1900s, the multi component site is approximately 168 acres of land next to Blue Ridge Parkway that was once owned by the Great Smoky Mountains Nation and later on purchased by the Eastern Band of Cherokee though a land exchange in 1937. The primary reason for the trade was due to outdated and overcrowded K-12 schools that led the Eastern Band of Cherokee to seek available land in order to build a new school as a replacement. The land swap was controversial at first because of many environmentalist's disapproval of moving the land out of protection under the park. All archaeological excavations conducted on this site after the land transfer were fully financed by the Cherokee.

=== Occupations ===
Ravensford site was also the host of a European American lumber village during the years of 1918 to 1934. The primary Ravensford occupations date back to the Early Archaic period to Historic Cherokee and late prehistoric periods as late as the early 18th century. The Cherokee continued to stay isolated from Europeans during the late 17th century to early 18th century, however, from late 18th century and on there was growing communication with settlers from Europe that led to drastic social and economic change for the Cherokee.

== Ravensford Site excavations ==
=== Archaeological excavations ===
Archaeological excavations began in the fall of 2016 at the old Cherokee Elementary School located in the Yellowhill Community within Ravensford Site. TRC Solutions, an environmental and engineering firm established in Asheville, is the primary group that worked on this excavation. The proposal was mainly developed by EBCI Tribal Historic Preservation Office. TRC Solutions was also behind the data recovery excavations that occurred on the Ravensford site during the years of 2004-2008 that led to the discovery of a well preserved archaeofaunal assemblage, dating back to phases such as Early Qualla (early- to mid-fifteenth century), Late Qualla (late seventeenth to early-eighteenth centuries), and Early Pigsah (A.D. 1150–1250).

=== Excavation methods ===
Various excavation techniques were used to recover the animal remnants at Ravensford, such as mechanical stripping, piece-plotting and water screening. Distinctive specimens were picked by hand throughout piece plotting and mechanical stripping processes, but a bulk of the faunal remnants were excavated through flotation and water screening. Mechanical stripping was used to identify 98 burials, 114 structures, and hundreds more of pit features. A backhoe was used to strip the plow zone in order to uncover more cultural features of the terrace.

== Archaeofaunal remains ==
=== Animal use pattern ===
Archaeofaunal remains discovered on the Ravensford site pointed to a steady pattern of using animals during the Late Pigsah to Late Qualla phase. This animal use pattern matches with concurrent sites along with ethnohistorical reports of Cherokee subsistence practices. The Ravensford faunal assemblage revealed a plethora of amphibian remains, more specifically toads. Similar to other sites among the Appalachian Summit Region, the same pattern of amphibian remnants was present throughout excavation.

=== Faunal analytic units ===
Due to the high volume of different animal groups, taxa assigned faunal categories by major taxonomic groups. The first faunal analytic unit retrieved a variety of materials from Late Pisgah and Early Qualla surroundings. The Late Pisah and Early Qualla selection had an abundance of white-tailed deer (Odocoileus virginianus) and black bear (Ursus americanus), together contributing to 94 percent of the remains found. The second faunal analytical unit recovered were the Middle and Late Qualla contexts. The Middle and Late Qualla collection is similar to the Late Pisah and Early Qualla collection; however, the main difference between the two is the higher amounts of white-tailed deer found and deficiency of black bear remains.
