= Shan Goshorn =

Eastern Band Cherokee artist (1957–2018)

- Born: July 3, 1957; Baltimore, Maryland, U.S.
- Died: December 1, 2018 (aged 61); Tulsa, Oklahoma, U.S.
- Citizenship: Eastern Band Cherokee, American
- Education: Cleveland Institute of Art; Atlanta College of Art
- Movement: Community art
- Spouse: Tom Pendergraft
- Awards: Eiteljorg Contemporary Art Artist Fellowship; 2013; United States Artists Fellowship; 2015

Shan Goshorn (July 3, 1957 – December 1, 2018) was an Eastern Band Cherokee artist, who lived in Tulsa, Oklahoma. Her interdisciplinary artwork expresses human rights issues, especially those that affect Native American people today. Goshorn used mixed media, including woven paper baskets, silversmithing, painting, and photography. She is best known for her baskets with Cherokee designs woven with archival paper reproductions of documents, maps, treaties, photographs and other materials that convey both the challenges and triumphs that Native Americans have experienced in the past and are still experiencing today.

== Early life ==
Goshorn was born on July 3, 1957, and raised in Baltimore, Maryland. She spent summers on the Qualla Boundary with her grandmother. She found most of her artistic inspiration in her teenage years when she worked for a summer at her tribe's Qualla Arts and Crafts Mutual cooperative in Cherokee, North Carolina. There, she became familiar with leading Eastern Band Cherokee artists and art forms. This experience led to a job with the Indian Arts and Crafts Board, where she helped organize Native art exhibitions and photographed the harvesting and preparation raw materials for Cherokee basketmaking, carving, and other cultural art forms.

=== Education ===
Goshorn attended the Cleveland Institute of Art in Ohio because of their silversmithing department. She was the only Native American student in the program and did not find support in exploring Native American customary arts. Goshorn left the Cleveland Institute of Art and went to the Atlanta College of Art where she finished her Bachelor of Fine Arts. She found inspiration upon discovering American Indian Art Magazine and artists such as Fritz Scholder (Luiseño) and T.C. Cannon (Kiowa/Caddo). After these discoveries, Goshorn moved to Tulsa, Oklahoma, in 1981 to start her career.

After Goshorn graduated from college, the U.S. Department of the Interior's Indian Arts and Crafts Board commissioned her to illustrate 20 Cherokee basket patterns in pen and ink. These drawings taught her the math and rhythm of basket weaving and convinced her that she could weave a basket but she did not try until 2008, when she wove her first basket from paper splints.

== Collections ==
=== Baskets ===
Goshorn wove more than 200 baskets from 2009 to 2018. The Museum of the Cherokee Indian identified her as the 14th living Eastern Band Cherokee to master the difficult double-weave technique. Goshorn also modeled some of her baskets after those that would have had specific uses in the tribal community. She told the American Indian Magazine, that it could take six months to weave a basket.

Before her focus on baskets, Goshorn's work consisted largely of drawings, paintings, photography and hand-tinted photography. With her work, Goshorn presented historical and current issues with the portrayal of Native American people.

Goshorn's work is in the collection of the National Museum of the American Indian, the Denver Art Museum, the Museum of Contemporary Native Arts in Santa Fe, N.M., the Museum of the Cherokee Indian in Cherokee, N.C., and the North American Native Museum in Zurich. Her work is also in the collection of the Renwick Gallery and was included in their 50th Anniversary show This Present Moment: Crafting a Better World.

Molly McGlennen writes of Goshorn's baskets that they "reveal Indigenous versions of history, which necessarily uncover – rather than enshroud -- the chasms of division between Native and non-Native peoples."

=== Honest Injun ===
Honest Injun is one of Goshorn's series that addresses human rights issues specific to Native Americans. She chose a multitude of hand-tinted, black-and-white images of brands that use Indian images and names to sell their product. This collection was made in response to America's quincentennial celebration of Christopher Columbus' discovery of the Americas.

=== Reclaiming Cultural Ownership; Challenging Indian Stereotypes ===
This collection consisted of 36 black-and-white documentary style images of Native American people living every day life. This series worked to challenge the way that Indian people are portrayed by the media.

=== Resisting the Mission: Filling the Silence ===
In 2017, Goshorn created the work, Resisting the Mission: Filling the Silence, consisting of 14 cylindrical paper baskets discussing the period of U.S. history when Native children were removed from their families to attend government-run residential schools. This work uses photographs of Native children who attended the Carlisle Indian Industrial School in Pennsylvania. Some of her relatives had attended Carlisle. She drew from archival materials in the Smithsonian. The National Museum of the American Indian acquired Resisting the Mission: Filling the Silence from Goshorn in 2019.

== Art career ==
Goshorn belonged to the art collective, the Urban Indian Five, along with Gerald Cournoyer (Oglala Lakota), Brent Greenwood (Chickasaw/Ponca), Thomas Poolaw (Kiowa), and Holly Wilson (Delaware Nation/Cherokee). The intertribal group of artists were interested in exploring art's ability to help Native people overcome historical trauma. They exhibited works in Indian Health Services facilities.

After her first double-weave work, Goshorn was awarded multiple fellowships and her work has been displayed in collections such as the National Museum of the American Indian (Smithsonian Institution, Washington DC), Gilcrease Museum (OK), IAIA Museum of Contemporary Native Arts (NM), Gorman Museum of Native American Art (UC Davis, CA), Minneapolis Institute of Art (MN), Eiteljorg Museum of American Indians and Western Art (IN), and the Museum of the Cherokee Indian (NC). Goshorn received a 2013 Eiteljorg Contemporary Art Fellowship, 2013 Smithsonian Artist Research Fellowship, 2013 SWAIA Discovery Fellowship, the 2014 Native Arts and Cultures Foundation Fellowship and the 2015 United States Artists Fellowship.

== Death ==
Shan Goshorn died on December 1, 2018, from cancer at the age of 61. She was survived by her husband Tom Pendergraft; her mother, Edna Goshorn; two sisters; her son, Loma Pendergraft; daughter, Neosha Pendergraft; and three stepdaughters, Natalee, Carolee, and Sommer. After her death, SWAIA issued the statement: "The Native art world has lost a giant. Shan Goshorn was one of a kind, much like her art."
