= Cliff Parker =

Cliff Parker is the name of:

- Cliff Parker (footballer) (1913–1983), English football player
- Clifford Gerard Parker (1936–2012), American Cherokee tribal leader
