= Amanda Swimmer =

Native American potter from North Carolina

- Born: Amanda Mabel Sequoyah; October 27, 1921; Big Cove, North Carolina, U.S.
- Died: November 24, 2018 (aged 97); Big Cove, North Carolina, U.S.
- Citizenship: Eastern Band Cherokee and American
- Occupation: Potter
- Title: Beloved Woman
- Spouse: Luke Swimmer
- Parent(s): Molly and Runningwolfe Sequoyah
- Awards: NC Heritage Award (1994); Mountain Heritage Award (2009)

Amanda Mabel Sequoyah Swimmer (October 27, 1921 – November 24, 2018) was an Eastern Band Cherokee potter. Swimmer's career focused on coil-built Cherokee pottery, and she worked to determine the name and function of these vessels. She was recognized in North Carolina for her contributions to the state's artistic and mountain heritage, and in 2018 she was named a Beloved Woman by the Eastern Band of Cherokee Indians.

== Early life and education ==
Swimmer was born Amanda Mabel Sequoyah to Molly Davis Sequoyah and Runningwolf Sequoyah on October 27, 1921, on the Qualla Boundary in North Carolina. Amanda was the youngest of 12. As a child, she lived with her family in a log cabin in Big Cove, a community of the Qualla Boundary. Her family was self-sufficient and grew all of its own food. As a child, she attended Big Cove Day School.

== Pottery ==
Swimmer taught herself to form and fire pots after discovering a deposit of clay near her home in the Big Cove community. She sold her first pots to tourists brought to her home by a park ranger familiar with her work.

At the age of 36, Swimmer began working at the Oconaluftee Indian Village, where Mabel Bigmeat taught her Cherokee pottery-building methods. Swimmer demonstrated pottery making at the village for more than 35 years, often building more than a thousand pots in a summer season. Swimmer was one of the first individuals to propose different uses and names for traditional Cherokee pottery.

Swimmer was instrumental in reviving historic Cherokee pottery techniques that had fallen into disuse in North Carolina after the disruption of the mass Cherokee removal from their homelands to Indian Territory west of the Mississippi River in 1839. lands in the American West. Swimmer did not use a potter's wheel to create any of her work. Instead, she built all of her pottery by shaping it only with her hands. She used various types of wood to fire it, and the final color of her pottery was determined by the type of wood that she used in firing.

== Legacy and honors ==
- In 1994 Swimmer received the North Carolina Heritage Award.
- In 2009 she received the Mountain Heritage Award from Western Carolina University for her work in traditional pottery.
- In 2018 the federally recognized Eastern Band of Cherokee Indians honored Swimmer as a Beloved Woman, the highest award it bestows on a member. At the time, Swimmer was one of three living recipients of this honor.

== Personal life and death ==
Swimmer (née Sequoyah) was 16 when she married Luke Swimmer. Luke was eleven years her senior, a widower and a father. After marriage she became a step-mother to his daughter, Mary Ellen. She said that they met at church: "Well, he used to stay over there across on the other side of the mountain; we went to church and we just got together, I met him there." Together the Swimmers had nine children together, six boys and three girls.

Swimmer was quoted as saying "I wouldn't take nothing to leave out of here. I'm 81. I've been here since I was born, and I don't tend to go nowheres. I just want to leave this world right here where I was born."

Swimmer died at her home in Big Cove on November 23, 2018, at the age of 97.

== See also ==
- Jeremiah Wolfe
- Myrtle Driver Johnson
