= New Kituwah Academy =

Cherokee bilingual school in North Carolina, United States

- ᎠᏤ ᎩᏚᏩ ᏧᎾᏕᎶᏆᏍᏗ

Location
- 60 Waterdam Road; Cherokee, Swain, North Carolina 28719; United States; 35°30′04″N 83°18′37″W

Information
- Motto: "Kituwah First"
- Opened: 19 April 2004
- Status: Open
- Authority: Eastern Band of Cherokee Indians
- NCES School ID: A1302201
- Principal: Crystal Carpenter
- Enrollment: 98 (2018)
- Accreditation: Southern Association of Colleges and Schools
- Website: https://ebcikpep.com/

The New Kituwah Academy (Cherokee: ᎠᏤ ᎩᏚᏩ ᏧᎾᏕᎶᏆᏍᏗ, Atse Kituwah Tsunadeloquasdi; gi-DOO-wah), also known as the Atse Kituwah Academy, is a private bilingual Cherokee- and English-language immersion school for Cherokee students in kindergarten through sixth grade, located in Cherokee, North Carolina, in the Yellow Hill community of the Qualla Boundary. It is owned by the Eastern Band of Cherokee Indians (EBCI), and operated by the Kituwah Preservation and Education Program (KPEP).

The school is part of a larger effort by the EBCI to save and revitalize the endangered Cherokee language by creating immersion and other language-learning opportunities; it also instills Cherokee cultural pride.

The word kituwah (ᎩᏚᏩ) is used by the Eastern Cherokee to refer to both themselves and their language; it can also mean "center" or "mother town" depending on context. New Kituwah is independent from the Cherokee Central Schools at Qualla Boundary.

== Background ==
In 2018 there were 1,520 Cherokee speakers out of 376,000 Cherokee enrolled in three federally recognized tribes, according to Ethnologue, which classified the language as "moribund." This means that most children are not learning and speaking the language. Only a handful of people under 40 years of age are fluent in Cherokee, and about eight Cherokee speakers die each month.

In 2018, the Eastern dialect present in North Carolina (which is taught at New Kituwah) was known by about 220 Eastern Band speakers. UNESCO considers the North Carolina dialect of Cherokee "severely endangered".

In June 2019, the Tri-Council of Cherokee tribes—the EBCI, the Cherokee Nation, and the United Keetoowah Band of Cherokee Indians—declared a state of emergency for the language due to the threat of it going extinct; they called for enhancement of revitalization programs. A tally by the three tribes had garnered a list of ~2,100 remaining speakers.

Another similar institution is the Cherokee Immersion School (Tsalagi Tsunadeloquasdi) in Tahlequah, Oklahoma.

== History and operations ==
In the 1990s, Cherokee Chief Joyce Dugan oversaw the creation of the Cultural Resources Division of the EBCI. The idea of an immersion school came up as other native peoples worldwide, such as the Māori, Hawaiians, Mohawk, and Piegan, had successfully created their own immersion programs. Later, in April 2004, a preschool immersion program was opened in the Dora Reed Childcare Center; these children comprised the first kindergarten class when the school opened. Chief Michell Hicks was largely responsible for establishing the academy. Classes had to move between buildings before a $6.5 million renovation was completed for the current location. This project was funded by the EBCI and a $1.3 million grant from the Cherokee Preservation Foundation.

The academy is located on the 309 acres (125 ha) site of the former Boundary Tree hotel and resort. New Kituwah opened in its newly remodeled, permanent building on September 8, 2009, and the school held its grand opening ceremony on October 7, 2009.

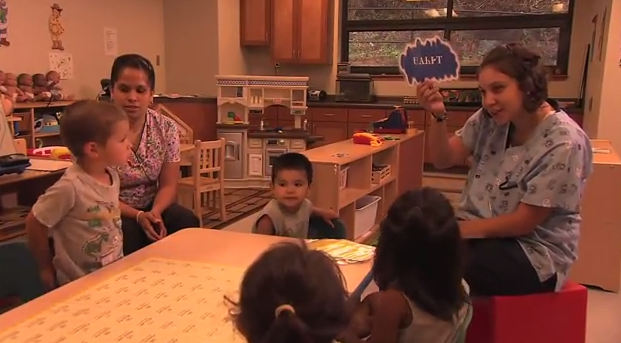
Cherokee instruction in a classroom at New Kituwah

Cherokee language instruction is a feature of New Kituwah, and inside the school is a prominent sign that states "English stops here." But to meet North Carolina's education standards, the school also begins to introduce English to students in the later grades. Similar to many other indigenous languages, there are few living fluent speakers of Cherokee, so many of the school's instructors are not fluent themselves.

As of 2019, after 15 years of operations, the school has not yet produced a fluent speaker. The school was featured in the 2014 documentary First Language: The Race to Save Cherokee, which focuses on the dialect of Cherokee spoken in North Carolina, and was also the focus of an undergraduate honors thesis project in 2017.

Tribal elder Myrtle Driver Johnson, who was given the title of Beloved Woman by the EBCI and is fluent, has been an active volunteer translator for the school. For New Kituwah, Johnson translated E. B. White's Charlotte's Web; one copy was given to the White estate and New Kituwah kept 200 books. Other posters and materials in Cherokee are designed by local artists and printed nearby.

New Kituwah was accredited by the Southern Association of Colleges and Schools in January 2015.

In 2020, the Atlanta Braves released a shirt with the text ᎠᏁᏦᎥᏍᎩ, anetsovsgi, 'ball player' to "help bring awareness to the native language" with the proceeds going to Kituwah and the Cherokee Speakers Council.
