= Cherokee Immersion School =

Cherokee language immersion school in Tahlequah, Oklahoma, United States

Coordinates: 35.84570°N 95.00428°W

- Cherokee: ᏣᎳᎩ ᏧᎾᏕᎶᏆᏍᏗ

Information
- Established: 2001; 25 years ago
- Grades: Preschool - Grade 8
- Enrollment: 141 (2018)

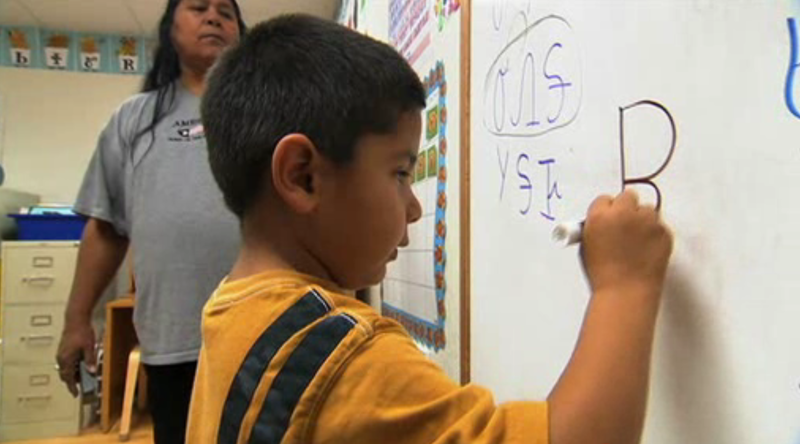
Oklahoma Cherokee language immersion school student writing in the Cherokee syllabary.

The Cherokee Immersion School (ᏣᎳᎩ ᏧᎾᏕᎶᏆᏍᏗ, Tsalagi Tsunadeloquasdi) is a Cherokee language immersion school in Park Hill, Oklahoma, with a Tahlequah post office address. It is for children in pre-school to grade 8.

It was founded by the Cherokee Nation in 2001 for the purpose of preserving the heavily endangered Cherokee language. Students must be members of a federally recognized tribe, and an application process is used as class size is limited. After finishing at the Cherokee Immersion School, students typically transfer to an affiliated school for grades 7 and 8. Attending the immersion school can help students enroll into Sequoyah High School (grades 9 through 12). Total enrollment was reported to be 141 in August 2018.

== Background ==
There were 1,520 Cherokee speakers out of 376,000 Cherokee in 2018 according to Ethnologue, which classified the language as "moribund", meaning children are not learning and speaking the language. Only a handful of people under 40 years of age are fluent, and about 8 speakers die each month. In 2018, 1,200 speakers were present in the Cherokee Nation and 101 were present in the United Keetoowah Band. The Kituwah (Middle or Eastern) dialect, which is taught at New Kituwah Academy in North Carolina, was known by ~220 Eastern Band Cherokee in 2018. In June 2019, the Tri-Council of Cherokee tribes declared a state of emergency for the language due to the threat of it going extinct, calling for the enhancement of revitalization programs. A tally by the three tribes had garnered a list of ~2,100 remaining speakers at that time.

The Cherokee language immersion school educates students from pre-school through eighth grade. The Department of Education of Oklahoma said that in 2012 state tests: 11% of the school's sixth-graders showed proficiency in math, and 25% showed proficiency in reading; 31% of the seventh-graders showed proficiency in math, and 87% showed proficiency in reading; 50% of the eighth-graders showed proficiency in math, and 78% showed proficiency in reading.

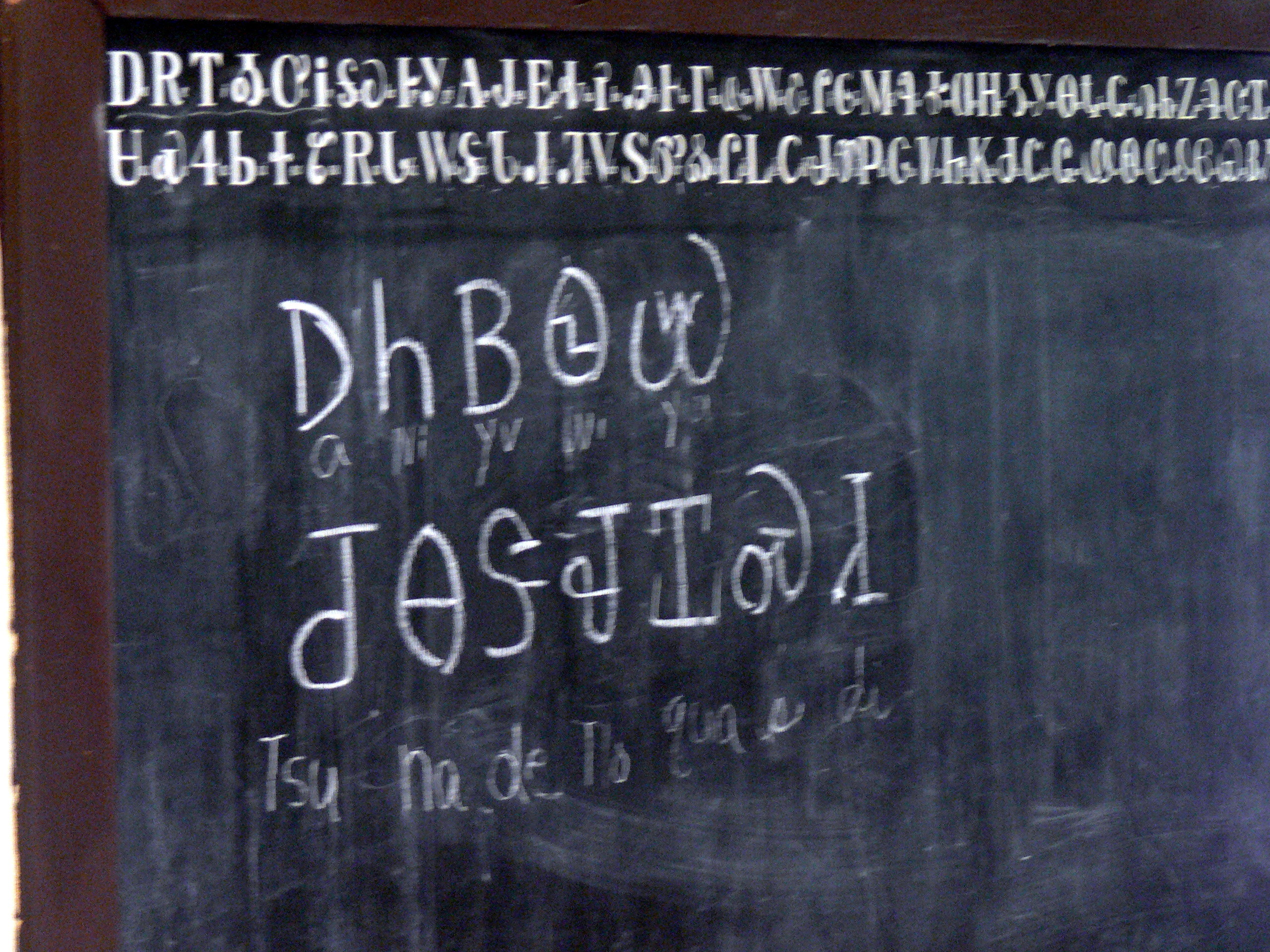
Adams Corner Cherokee language chalk board in schoolhouse.

The Oklahoma Department of Education listed the charter school as a Targeted Intervention school, meaning the school was identified as a low-performing school but has not so that it was a Priority School. Ultimately, the school made a C, or a 2.33 grade point average on the state's A-F report card system. The report card shows the school getting an F in mathematics achievement and mathematics growth, a C in social studies achievement, a D in reading achievement, and an A in reading growth and student attendance. "The C we made is tremendous," said school principal Holly Davis, "[t]here is no English instruction in our school's younger grades, and we gave them this test in English." She said she had anticipated the low grade because it was the school's first year as a state-funded charter school, and many students had difficulty with English. Eighth graders who graduate from the Tahlequah immersion school are fluent speakers of the language, and they usually go on to attend Sequoyah High School where classes are taught in both English and Cherokee.

In 2022 it was scheduled to occupy the future Durbin Feeling Language Center. The groundbreaking ceremony for that building occurred in May 2021.

== Second campus ==
A second campus, Greasy Immersion Charter School, was added in November 2021, when the school purchased Greasy School in Greasy, Oklahoma, located in southern Adair County 10 miles (16 km) south of Stilwell. Situated in largest area of Cherokee speakers in the world, the opportunity for that campus is for students to spend the day in an immersion school and then return to a Cherokee-speaking home.
