= Gerard Parker =

Native American leader (1936–2012)

Clifford Gerard Parker

Principal Chief of the Eastern Band of Cherokee Indians
- In office 1995–1995
- Preceded by: Jonathan L. Taylor
- Succeeded by: Joyce Dugan

Personal details
- Born: July 24, 1936
- Died: December 1, 2012 (aged 76)

Military service
- Allegiance: United States
- Branch/service: United States Army
- Battles/wars: Korean War

Clifford Gerard Parker, known as Gerard Parker (July 24, 1936 – December 1, 2012) was the 22nd Principal Chief of the Eastern Band of Cherokee Indians for 16 days in 1995. Prior to this, he had served as Vice Chief for six years under Jonathan L. Taylor, who was impeached after two terms. He continued to serve as Vice Chief under Joyce Dugan, who was elected in 1995.

Parker had represented Painttown on the tribal council for 16 years, and served on numerous committees, helping to develop the EBCI's emergency response capability.

== Biography ==
Parker was born into a large family: he had two sisters, Elba Crain and Christine Parker (who later married Buchanan), and three brothers Carroll, Don, and Thomas Parker.

He had a family of his own, with children Forrest Gerard Parker, Joshua Thomas Parker, James R. Welch, Brad Parker, Gerena Parker, and Lori Lambert.

Parker was a veteran of the United States Army, serving in the Korean War. After his return, he worked in business, becoming General Manager of the tribe's Boundary Tree Hotel, an early enterprise of the Eastern Band of Cherokee Indians.

He became politically active and was repeatedly re-elected as the representative from Painttown, serving for 16 years. He ran and was elected as Vice Chief 1989, serving for six years under Principal Chief Jonathan L. Taylor, who completed nearly two terms. During this period, Taylor was negotiating with representatives of the state of North Carolina to complete an agreement to allow the EBCI to establish a gaming casino on its property. Harrah's Cherokee opened in 1997 as a result of this compact.

Taylor was impeached by the council prior to the inauguration of the winner of the 1995 election for Principal Chief. Parker served for 16 days as Principal Chief. He resumed his duty as Vice Chief under Joyce Dugan, who was elected and took office in 1995.

Preceded by Jonathan L. Taylor	Chief of the Eastern Band of Cherokee Indians; 1995	Succeeded by Joyce Dugan
