= Joyce Dugan =

Cherokee administrator and politician

Principal Chief of the Eastern Band of Cherokee Indians
- In office 1995–1999
- Preceded by: Gerard Parker
- Succeeded by: Leon Jones

Personal details
- Born: c. 1952
- Education: Western Carolina University (BS, MS)
- Occupation: Administrator; Politician; Teacher

Joyce Dugan (born c.1952, Cherokee) is an American educator, school administrator, and politician; she served as the 24th Principal Chief of the federally recognized Eastern Band of Cherokee Indians (1995-1999), based in Western North Carolina. She was the first woman to be elected to this office, and as of 2024 the only one.

Leading the tribe when it opened Harrah's Cherokee, a major gaming casino in November 1997, Dugan managed a time of economic expansion for the tribe. She worked to restructure the government and adopt more financial controls. She also established a cultural division in tribal government, working on "cultural heritage issues such as language, repatriation, museum exhibit, and education." Dugan was also active in environmental issues and health.

== Biography ==
Joyce Conseen Dugan was born in Western North Carolina to a Cherokee mother, who worked as a maid, and a white father from Tennessee. She said she was called "the white Indian" when growing up but was reared in Cherokee culture and enrolled as a member in the Eastern Band of Cherokee Indians. She attended local public schools. She studied at Western Carolina University, earning her BS (1974) and MS (1981) in Education.

After first working as a teacher's aide, Dugan started her teaching career in the Cherokee Central Schools after earning her undergraduate degree.

After Dugan built a strong record as an educator, in 1990, the EBCI appointed her as superintendent of the Cherokee Central Schools. This system, based in Cherokee, North Carolina, provides education to children at Qualla Boundary through schools ranging from pre-school through K-12. It has an arrangement with the federal Bureau of Indian Affairs, which used to operate a separate system of Indian boarding schools.

In 1995 she was persuaded to run for political office as Principal Chief, against the two-term incumbent and longtime politician, Jonathan L. Taylor. She won the primary and run-off, defeating him by a two-to-one margin.

Taking over as the Cherokee opened their first gaming casino, Harrah's Cherokee, Dugan worked to establish strong financial controls in tribal administration and restructure the government.

She also established a cultural division in tribal government, which was to be funded in part by monies generated by the casino. This would support language teaching and development among both adults and children, repatriation of artifacts, development of museum exhibits, and general education. Dugan was also active in environmental issues and health. For instance, she initiated programs to try to reduce the Cherokees' high rate of diabetes.

=== Later years ===
After leaving office, Dugan was hired by Harrah's Cherokee to develop a transition program to equip the tribe to be able to take over the casino business. She later became the casino's Director of Public, Government and Community Relations.

With B. Lynne Harlan, Dugan wrote a book, The Cherokee (2002), which describes the history and cultural practices of her tribe. It was published by the EBCI.

In 2009 Dugan returned to the tribe's education system when she was appointed again as superintendent of the Cherokee Central Schools. She served until 2011.

Since 2013, Dugan has served into her second four-year term on the Board of Trustees for Western Carolina University. She was first appointed by the Governor for the term July 1, 2013 to June 30, 2017. She was next appointed by the General Assembly for the term of July 1, 2017 to June 30, 2021.

Dugan has been active in other community groups, serving on "the Cherokee Indian Hospital Governing Board, the Development Foundation Board of Directors, the North Carolina Center for the Advancement of Teaching, and the Board of Directors for Mainspring [Conservation] (formerly Land Trust for the Little Tennessee)." The latter group has been working with the EBCI to develop the Nikwasi Trail, to acquire sacred sites of tribal mounds and towns along the Little Tennessee River. The EBCI intends to develop a trail and related resources to link and interpret these sacred Cherokee sites. In 2020 Mainspring Conservation Trust acquired land holding the Watauga Mound and part of the ancient town; it will preserve it for the EBCI.

== Legacy and honors ==
- In 1992, Dugan was awarded the Distinguished Woman of North Carolina in Education title.
- In 1997, she received the Distinguished Alumni Award from Western Carolina University.
- That year she was listed on WCU's Honor Roll of Peak Performers from the College of Education and Allied Professions.
- In 2006, she was awarded an Honorary Doctorate degree from the University of North Carolina Chapel Hill for her efforts in cultural preservation.
- In 2026, she was awarded an Honorary Doctor of Education from Western Carolina University for her lifelong commitment to education to the Cherokee people.

== See also ==
- List of Native American politicians
- Native American women in politics

Preceded by Gerard Parker	Chief of the Eastern Band of Cherokee Indians; 1995-1999	Succeeded by Leon Jones
