= Museum of the Cherokee People =

Museum in Cherokee, North Carolina

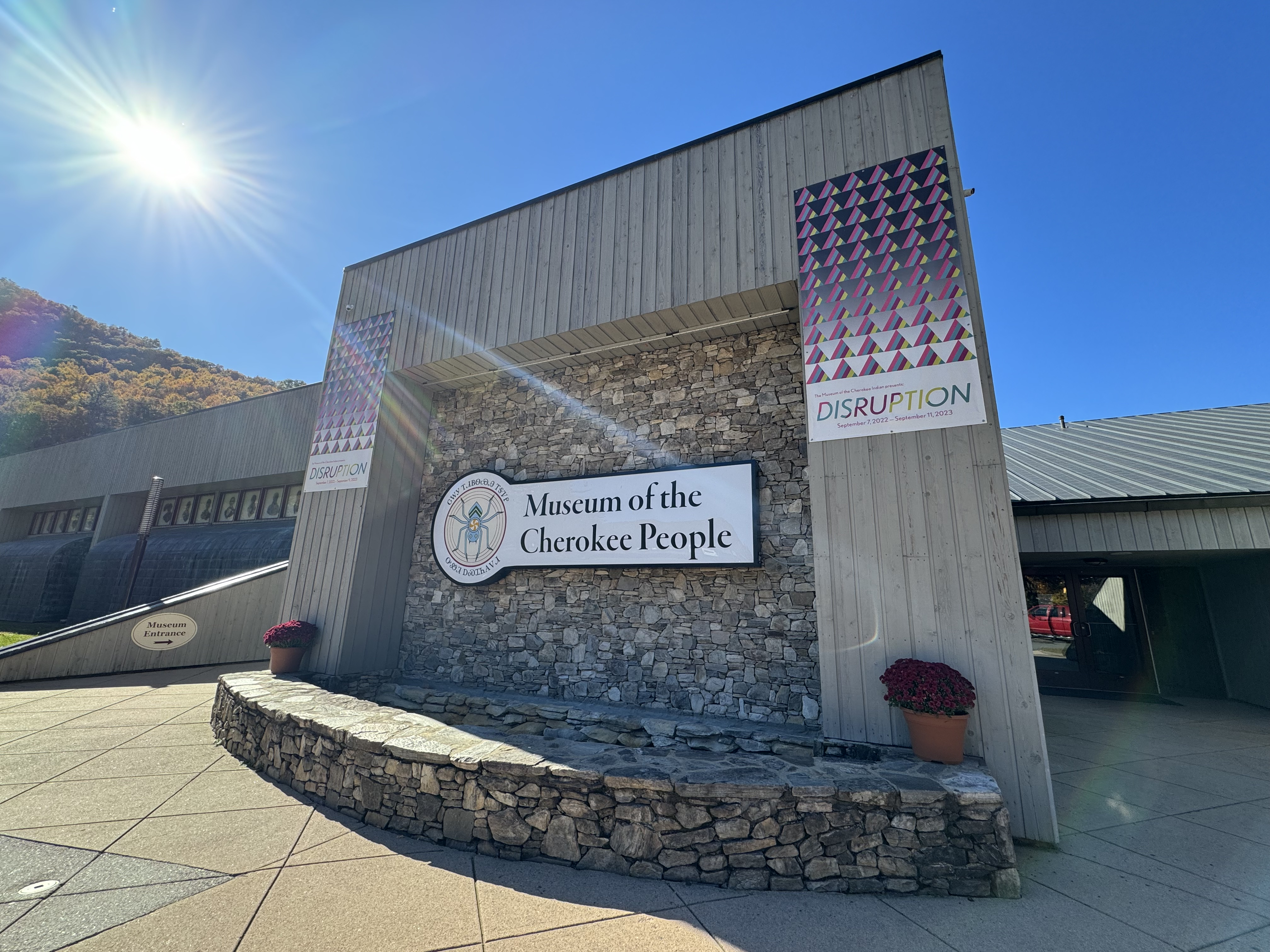

- Location within North Carolina
- Former name: Museum of the Cherokee Indian
- Established: 1948; 78 years ago
- Location: 589 Tsali Boulevard, Cherokee, North Carolina, U.S.
- Coordinates: 35.48451°N 83.31642°W
- Type: Art museum, history museum, cultural museum, archive, community center, educational center
- Accreditation: North American Reciprocal Museum Association
- Owner: Cherokee Historical Association
- Website: motcp.org

The Museum of the Cherokee People (MTCP), formerly known as the Museum of the Cherokee Indian (MCI), is a 501(c)3 nonprofit cultural arts and history museum, educational center, and archive founded in 1948, and located in Cherokee, North Carolina. The museum provides permanent exhibitions, an artifact collection, workshops, educational programs, and a museum store. The museum was previously operated by the Cherokee Historical Association, but later became its own entity. It has been part of the North American Reciprocal Museum Association.

== History ==
Founded as the Museum of the Cherokee Indian in 1948 by the Eastern Band of Cherokee, it was located in a log cabin building that also housed McLeans Indian Store and the Ocona Lufty Inn. The museum's operations have provided tourism, jobs, and commercial enterprise in an area where unemployment was high; while simultaneously highlighting Cherokee people and preserving their cultural traditions as a fundamental part of the museums operation. They work to counteract inaccurate imagery of Cherokee culture often found in mainstream media. The Eastern Band of Cherokee also established other local attractions, including the Unto These Hills outdoor theater series in 1950; and the Oconaluftee Indian Village in 1952. After a major renovation in 2023, the museum changed its name to the Museum of the Cherokee People to clarify that the three federally recognized Cherokee tribes are one people. Besides the Eastern Band of Cherokee Indians based here in Cherokee, there is the United Keetoowah Band and the Cherokee Nation, the largest tribal government in the U.S., both of which are in Tahlequah, Oklahoma.

In October 2023, the museum name was changed from Museum of the Cherokee Indian to Museum of the Cherokee People.

== Exhibitions and artists ==
Museum exhibitions have focused on Cherokee history and pre-history with topics such as "stone tools and weapons", "mineral displays", "Indian corn", "Cherokee pipes", "bone ornaments", "seashell ornaments", "game stones", "Oconaluftee Village crafts", "model of ancient burial", "mortar and pestle", "bannerstones, birdstones, and boatstones", "Cherokee people today", "Emissaries of Peace: The 1762 Cherokee/British Delegations" (2004), and the "origins of the American Indian".

The Cherokee Potters Guild was formed in January 2003, after a series of workshops held at the Museum of the Cherokee. The museum also hosts a number of annual summer and fall festivals, including the "Cherokee Voices Festival", and the "Festival of Native Peoples".

Folklorist Barbara R. Duncan had been employed by the museum to research Cherokee legends, myths, and family stories. Some were published in "Living Stories of the Cherokee" (University of North Carolina Press, 1998).

- Attakullakulla
- Mary Adair
- Goingback Chiltoskey
- Shan Goshorn
- Jenean Hornbuckle
- Will West Long

== See also ==
- Cherokee Preservation Foundation
- List of museums in North Carolina
