= Cherokee Preservation Foundation =

Cherokee nonprofit foundation

- Formation: 2000; 26 years ago
- Type: Nonprofit foundation
- Headquarters: Cherokee, North Carolina, United States
- Executive Director: Bobby Raines
- Key people: Tinker Jenks; Jenea Taylor; Deb Owle; Monaka Wachacha
- Revenue: $9,326,190 (2021)
- Expenses: $4,105,873 (2021)
- Website: www.cherokeepreservation.org

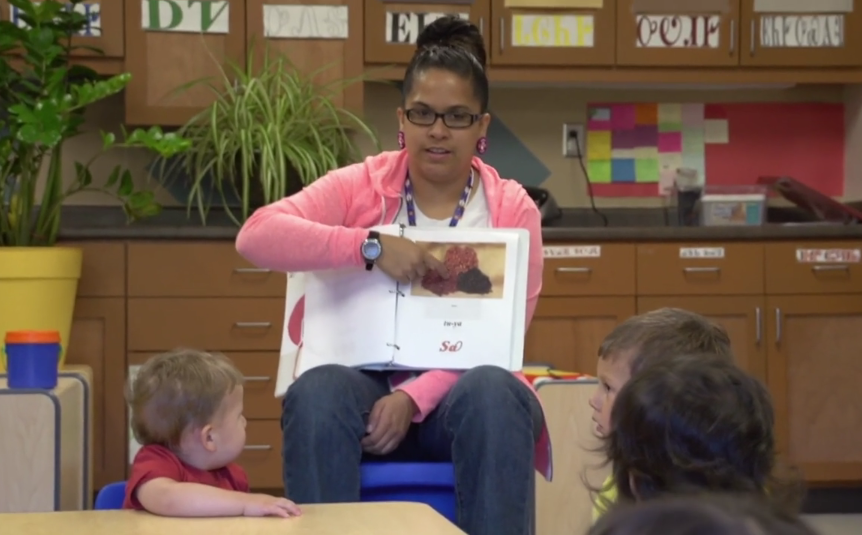
The Cherokee language being taught to preschoolers at New Kituwah Academy

The Cherokee Preservation Foundation is an independent nonprofit foundation established in 2000 as part of the Tribal-State Compact amendment between the Eastern Band of Cherokee Indians (EBCI) and the State of North Carolina. The Foundation is funded by the EBCI from gaming revenues generated by the Tribe; it is not associated with any for-profit gaming entity and is a separately functioning organization independent of the Tribal government. It works to improve the quality of life of the EBCI and strengthen the western North Carolina region by balancing Cherokee ways with the pursuit of new opportunities.

The Foundation focuses on cultural preservation, economic development, job creation, and environmental preservation and is an engine for rural community development on the Qualla Boundary and the surrounding Haywood, Jackson, Clay, Macon, Graham, Swain and Cherokee counties.

== Activities ==
=== Cultural preservation of the Eastern Band of Cherokee Indians ===
Much of the Cherokee Preservation Foundation's work in support of cultural preservation is concentrated on the perpetuation of Cherokee craft traditions, the revitalization of the Cherokee language, and the development of a culture-based leadership initiative.

==== Cherokee arts and crafts ====
The Foundation supports the efforts of organizations such as Qualla Arts and Crafts Cooperative, the Oconaluftee Institute of Cultural Arts, RTCAR (Revitalization of Traditional Cherokee Artisan Resources), Cherokee Central Schools and many others to share, preserve and perpetuate the rich art and crafts history and knowledge of the Cherokees.

==== Revitalization of the Cherokee language ====
A survey of Cherokee speakers released in 2006 showed that there were only 275 Cherokee speakers on the Qualla Boundary at that time. By 2018, the number was reported to be 217. Language preservation efforts include the New Kituwah Academy (a bilingual language immersion program for children), conventional language classes available to tribal members of all ages, and a partnership with Western Carolina University to create instructional materials in Cherokee and offer a scholarship to train students to deliver content in the Cherokee language in New Kituwah Academy classrooms.

==== Culturally-based leadership ====
The Foundation supports several leadership programs that are based on the Cherokee culture. These include the following:

- The Cherokee Youth Council, which empowers youth 13-17 by giving them a voice to speak out on issues important to them. The CYC is leading recycling awareness efforts on the Qualla Boundary and has produced a film "C.Y.C Teen Pregnancy Film" (2001) about teenage pregnancy from a youth and a native perspective.
- An annual cross-cultural Costa Rica Eco-Study Tour for high school students from western North Carolina.
- The Jones-Bowman Adult Leadership Program, which enables tribal members who are college undergraduates to develop their leadership capabilities by participating in individual leadership learning programs.
- The Right Path, a culture-based leadership development program for adult members of the Eastern Band of Cherokee Indians.

=== Economic development and job creation ===
Tourism is a principal driver of economic development on the Qualla Boundary, the homeland of the Eastern Band of Cherokee Indians, and significant funding from the Foundation has strengthened the Tribe's principal cultural attractions, including the Museum of the Cherokee Indian, Qualla Arts and Crafts Mutual, Inc., the Oconaluftee Indian Village, and the Unto These Hills an outdoor theater.

Two grantees of the Foundation, the Cherokee Chamber of Commerce and the Sequoyah Fund, have been strong forces that are changing the course of local business development. The Sequoyah Fund, for example, has made low-cost loans available to merchants in the Cherokee business district for new roofs and building facades that complement the Tribe's new Riverbend development and enhance the visual appeal of Cherokee's downtown. Other Sequoyah Fund loans and support services are helping new and experienced entrepreneurs to start and expand businesses.

=== Environmental preservation ===
For many hundreds of years, the Cherokee people have had a strong connection to the environment and a commitment to land stewardship. In 2008, an initiative known as The Generations Qualla action plan was introduced by the Cherokee Preservation Foundation in an effort to support the Eastern Band of Cherokee Indians' broader sustainability and energy conservation goals. To this day, many new green initiatives are underway including work to make tribal buildings more energy efficient, development of a green building standard, a significant increase in local recycling, streamlining of the site review process for all construction on the Qualla Boundary, and engagement of Cherokee communities in environmental improvement projects.
