= Eastern Band of Cherokee Indians =

Federally recognized Indian Tribe in North Carolina

Eastern Band of Cherokee Indians ᏣᎳᎩᏱ ᏕᏣᏓᏂᎸᎩ (Cherokee) Tsalagiyi Detsadanilvgi
- Domestic dependent nation
- Seal

- Location in the United States
- Coordinates: 35°28′37″N 83°19′13″W
- U.S. Recognition: 1868
- Qualla Boundary: 1876
- Incorporation: March 11, 1889
- Capital: Cherokee

Government
  - Type: Tribal Council
  - Principal Chief: Michell Hicks
  - Vice Chief: Alan B. Ensley

Population
  - Total: 16,000+
- Demonym: Cherokee
- Website: https://ebci.gov/

The Eastern Band of Cherokee Indians (EBCI), (Cherokee: ᏣᎳᎩᏱ ᏕᏣᏓᏂᎸᎩ, Tsalagiyi Detsadanilvgi) is a federally recognized Indian tribe based in western North Carolina in the United States. They are descended from the small group of 800–1,000 Cherokees who remained in the Eastern United States after the U.S. military, under the Indian Removal Act, moved the other 15,000 Cherokees to west of the Mississippi River in the late 1830s, to Indian Territory. Those Cherokees remaining in the east were to give up tribal Cherokee citizenship and to assimilate. They became U.S. citizens but in the 20th century also recovered tribal rights.

The history of the Eastern Band closely follows that of the Qualla Boundary, a land trust made up of an area of their original territory. When they reorganized as a tribe, they had to buy back the land from the U.S. government. The EBCI also own, hold, or maintain additional lands in the vicinity, and as far away as 100 miles (160 km) from the Qualla Boundary. The Eastern Band of Cherokee Indians are primarily the descendants of those persons listed on the 1925 Baker Rolls of Cherokee Indians. They gained federal recognition as a tribe in the 20th century. The Qualla Boundary is not technically a reservation because the tribe bought the land outright.

The Eastern Band of Cherokee Indians is one of three federally recognized Cherokee tribes, the others being the Cherokee Nation and the United Keetoowah Band of Cherokee Indians, both based in Oklahoma. The EBCI headquarters is in the namesake community of Cherokee, North Carolina, in the Qualla Boundary, south of the Great Smoky Mountains National Park.

== History ==
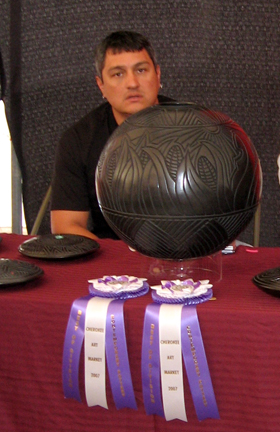
Joel Queen, award-winning Eastern Band sculptor and ceramic artist

The Eastern Band members are descended primarily from about 800 Cherokees living along the remote Oconaluftee River who were not forcibly subjected to the Trail of Tears to Indian Territory (now Oklahoma). Principal Chief Yonaguska, with the help of his adopted European American son William Holland Thomas, managed to avoid removal. The Eastern Band of Cherokee Indians have maintained many traditional tribal practices. Many prominent Cherokee historians are affiliated with, or are members of, the Eastern Band.

Tsali (pronounced [ˈtsali]), another Cherokee leader, opposed the removal. He remained in the traditional Cherokee lands with a small group who resisted the U.S. Army and tried to thwart the removal. Tsali was eventually captured. He was executed by the U.S. in exchange for the lives of the small band he protected. They were allowed to remain in the Cherokee homeland, with the condition that they give up Cherokee tribal citizenship and assimilate as U.S. citizens.

Their descendants reorganized in the 20th century and gained federal recognition as a tribe known as the Eastern Band of Cherokee Indians (named in reference to the majority of the tribe, who moved west to Indian Territory in 1838–1839). They bought back land in what is known as the Qualla Boundary, part of their traditional territory that had been ceded to the US government by the 1835 Treaty of New Echota prior to removal.

The Museum of the Cherokee People in Cherokee, North Carolina, exhibits an extensive collection of artifacts and items of historical and cultural interest. These range from the Woodland and early South Appalachian Mississippian culture periods, of which there are remains such as numerous earthwork platform mounds in the area, to 16th- and 17th-century Cherokee culture. The Qualla Arts and Crafts Mutual, located near the museum, sells traditional crafts made by its members. Founded in 1946, the Qualla Arts and Crafts Mutual is the country's oldest and foremost Native American crafts cooperative.

== Contemporary language and religion ==
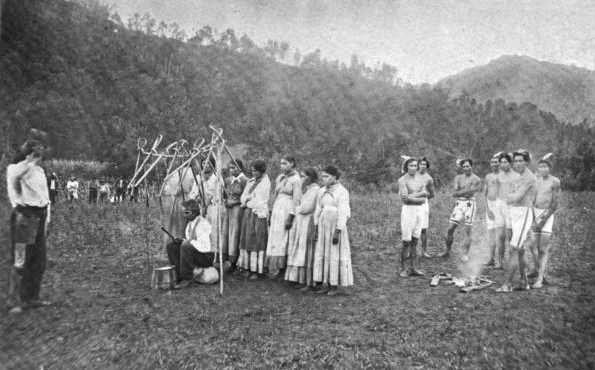
A stickball dance on the Qualla Boundary. 1897.

More than two dozen Christian churches of various denominations are located within the Qualla Boundary. Many of the traditional religious practices of the Eastern Band have, over time, blended with new age views and customs according to Cherokee traditionalists. They have diverged as the result of cultural isolation of the various factions of Cherokee society. Many traditional dances and ceremonies are still practiced by the Eastern Band.

The Eastern Band began a language immersion program requiring all graduating high school seniors to speak the tribal language beginning 2007. Of the total population in the Qualla Boundary, there are approximately 900 speakers, 72% of whom are over age 50.

== Qualla Boundary ==
Location of the Eastern Cherokee Indian Land Trust

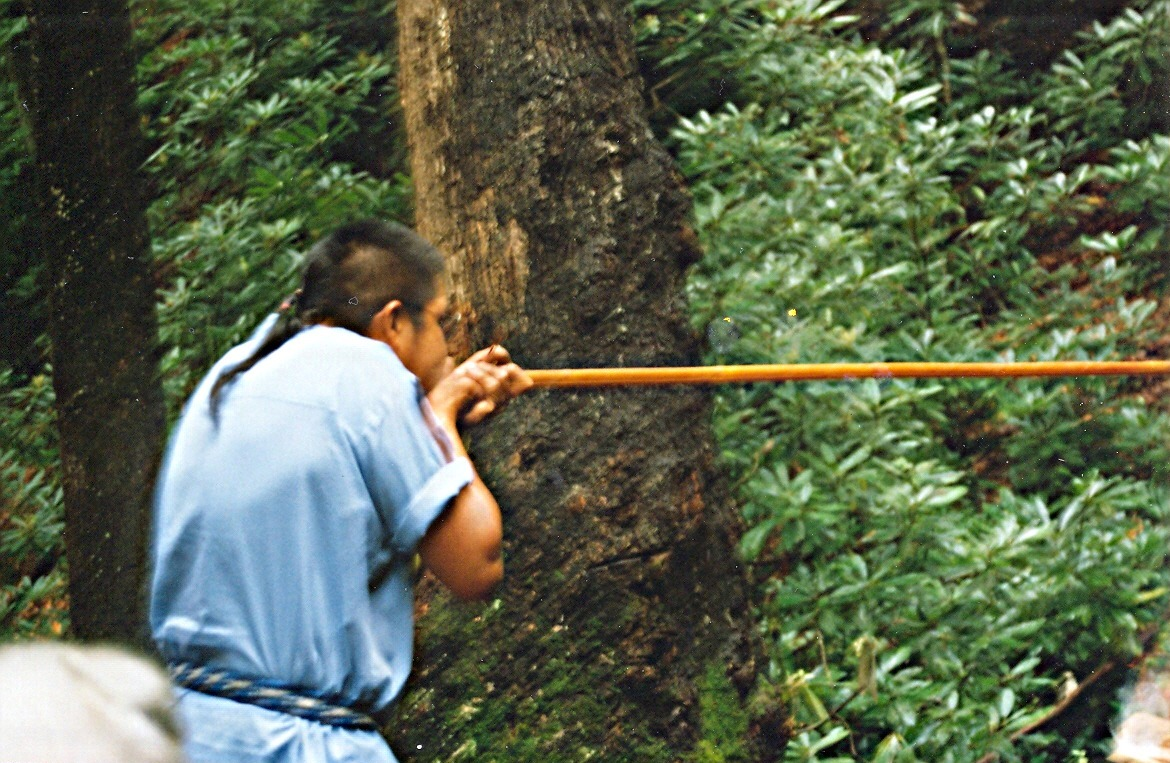
Blowgun demonstration in Oconaluftee Indian Village, Cherokee, North Carolina

The Eastern Cherokee Indian Nation Land, officially known as the Qualla Boundary, is located at 35°28′43″N 83°16′20″W in western North Carolina, just south of Great Smoky Mountains National Park. The main part of the reserve lies in eastern Swain County and northern Jackson County, but smaller non-contiguous sections are located to the southwest in Cherokee and Graham counties (Cheoah and Snowbird communities, respectively). A small part of the main reserve extends eastward into Haywood County. The total land area of these parts is 213.934 km^{2} (82.600 sq mi), with a 2000 census resident population of 8,092 persons.

The Qualla Boundary is not a reservation but rather a land trust supervised by the Bureau of Indian Affairs. The tribe purchased this land in the 1870s, and it was subsequently placed under federal protective trust; it is not a reservation created by the government. Individuals can buy, own, and sell the land, provided they are enrolled members of EBCI tribe. The land is a fragment of the extensive original homeland of the Cherokee Nation, which once stretched from western Virginia, North and South Carolina, and west to present-day southeastern Tennessee and northeastern Alabama. In the 19th century, the people had to purchase their land to regain it after it was taken over by the U.S. government through treaty cessions, which had all been negotiated by a small percentage of assimilated Cherokees.

Today the tribe earns most of its revenue from a combination of federal and state funds, tourism, and the Harrah's Cherokee casino, established in the early 1990s. The gaming revenue is directed at economic development, as well as tribal welfare and support of cultural initiatives, such as the language immersion program and development of historic preservation programs.

=== Recreational tourism ===
Tourism in the area also offers many campgrounds, trails and river adventures, mountain biking, fishing, golfing, spas, Great Smoky Mountains National Park, the Blue Ridge Parkway, Unto These Hills Outdoor Historical Drama, Oconaluftee Indian Village, Cherokee Botanical Garden and Nature Trail, the Museum of the Cherokee People, zoos, restaurants, and a collection of galleries and shops representing fine traditional artists, such as Qualla Arts and Crafts Mutual.

=== Gaming relations with North Carolina ===
In 1988, the U.S. Congress passed the Indian Gaming Regulatory Act, which allowed federally recognized tribes to establish casinos on tribal property. Under the act, tribes are limited to offer casino games that correspond to the existing level of gaming allowed under state law. North Carolina was unique in permitting the Cherokees to establish a casino offering Class III gaming in 1994, well before the state allowed a lottery. The typical pattern has been for states to offer a lottery, followed by an agreement between the state and the Indian tribe to allow establishment of a casino or other form of gaming operation.

The first major casino in North Carolina, Harrah's Cherokee (in partnership with Caesars Entertainment), was opened on Qualla Boundary on November 13, 1997. The casino was the result of nearly ten years of negotiations among tribal, state, and federal officials. Principal Chief Jonathan Taylor, North Carolina Lead Liaison and Chief Negotiator David T. McCoy, and Governor Jim Hunt had developed a plan for a casino that would meet state laws and satisfy local and tribal concerns. It opened during the tenure of Principal Chief Joyce Dugan.

Tribal leaders wanted to be able to offer more than bingo and other Class I forms of gambling, to attract larger crowds and generate greater revenue. The tribe had previously opened a small casino offering forms of video poker and electronic bingo. This had been challenged by the Asheville, North Carolina, U.S. Attorney on the grounds that the tribe was offering a form of gambling that was not legal elsewhere in North Carolina. The tribe wanted to ensure agreements with the state to prevent such problems.

Since North Carolina established a state lottery in 2005, Harrah's Cherokee casino has been permitted to extend its offered games to include Class II and III gambling. As thousands of people visit Harrah's each year and the casino's popularity continues to increase, the economic benefits of the casino are being realized. Annually, at least $5 million of casino profits is given to the Cherokee Preservation Fund; this institution pays for projects that promote non-gambling economic development, protect the environment, and preserve Cherokee heritage and culture. Another portion of casino profits goes to improving tribal healthcare, education, housing, etc. Part of the revenue goes to the state of North Carolina, as provided by the agreement drafted by Taylor and Hunt.

In 1996, the first amendment to the compact was entered into the Federal Register, establishing the appointments of the Gaming Commission, staggered five-year terms for commissioners, and the ability to hire independent legal counsel upon tribal approval. In 2001, the second amendment to the compact was entered: it raised the gambling age from 18 to 21, affected the qualifications and appointments to the Gambling Commission between the tribe and the North Carolina governor, created the Cherokee Preservation Foundation, and clarified games, prizes and gifts awarded. In 2002, an agreement of authorization was reached that allowed the tribe to hold electronic bingo and raffle games.

In 2011, Governor Bev Perdue and Principal Chief Michell Hicks came to an agreement on a new 30-year gaming compact. The agreement allowed live table games and grants the tribe sole rights to provide those games west of Interstate 26. Based on this grant of exclusivity, the tribe had agreed to a revenue-sharing agreement with the state, with funds to be used by the state only for public education purposes. In September 2015 the tribe opened their second casino, Harrah's Cherokee Valley River, in Murphy, North Carolina. In July 2019 Governor Roy Cooper signed Senate Bill 154 that permitted wagering on sports and horse racing on tribal lands, after the state legalized sports betting in other venues.

== Outside the Qualla Boundary ==
=== Acquisition of sacred mounds and towns ===
Since the late 20th century, the tribe has acquired such sacred sites as Nikwasi Mound (2019, in Franklin, North Carolina) and, downriver, Cowee (2007) 70 acres (28 ha) and Kituwah (1996) mounds, each along the Little Tennessee River. Each is estimated to have been built more than 1,000 years ago. The EBCI also acquired the Tallulah (1996) mound in Robbinsville, North Carolina. In 2020, Mainspring Conservation Trust acquired 40 acres (16 ha) that include the Watauga Mound and part of the ancient Watauga Town site, to conserve on behalf of the EBCI. The property is located between Nikwasi upstream and Cowee downstream. On January 5, 2026 the town of Franklin, North Carolina voted to return the Noquisiyi Mound to the EBCI.

The EBCI is working with local non-profits, such as Mainspring Conservation Trust, Western Carolina University, and local governments to develop the "Nikwasi Trail", highlighting a route along the Little Tennessee River. This is formally known as the Nikwasi-Cherokee Cultural and Heritage Corridor, beginning in Macon County, North Carolina, where the river enters from Georgia. In 2018 partner groups installed a viewing overlook with interpretive panels across the river from the Cowee mound site. This is the second sacred site on this corridor going north from Franklin. More highlighting and interpretation of such sites is planned, in connection with related activities along this route.

Since 2011 the EBCI have been collaborating with regional universities, the Cherokee Preservation Foundation, and the Duke Energy Foundation on what is called the "Western North Carolina Mounds and Towns Project." As part of this, Western Carolina University, the Coweeta Long Term Ecological Research Program at the University of Georgia, and the Tribal Historic Preservation Office of the EBCI have conducted outreach with tribal members, in what is described as Indigenous archeology. The data gathered integrates tribal knowledge, as well as information from GIS and non-invasive technologies, excavations, archeology, and anthropology. This has enabled the tribe to have a better record of mounds, with location data and chronological data for its use. Because such mounds were subject to looting in the past, the tribe is keeping the locations of most mounds secret in order to preserve them.

=== Kituwah LLC ===
The Kituwah Limited Liability Company (LLC) was established in 2019 to launch or acquire businesses to help diversify the tribes revenues outside of gaming. Kituwah is focused on property development, entertainment and hospitality, and professional services. That same year, Kituwah purchased 200 acres (81 ha) in the Sevierville, Tennessee neighborhood of Kodak, for $13.5 million; its first tenant was a Buc-ee's store, with a future Courtyard by Marriott and a sports betting bar. In 2022, discussions began with historical theme park company Puy du Fou on a possible partnership at the Sevierville site. Kituwah also retains management and operations of Cherokee Cinemas and in 2020 acquired Wylliesburg, Virginia-based Cardinal Homes Inc., a modular home builder, for $5.8 million.

=== EBCI Holdings, LLC ===
Established in 2020, EBCI Holdings is an LLC formed to diversify the tribe's holdings in the commercial gaming and hospitality business. Both Harrah's Cherokee Casino Resort and Harrah's Cherokee Valley River were consolidated under EBCI Holdings and in 2021 purchased its first casino outside North Carolina, Caesars Southern Indiana for $250 million.

In December 2021, EBCI Holdings announced the creation of a "gaming technology incubator" fund, where they would invest in gambling startups. In August 2022, EBCI Holdings announced a joint venture with Caesars Entertainment on a $650 million project to develop Caesars Virginia, in Danville, Virginia, slated to open in late 2024. In November 2022, the Kentucky Horse Racing Commission approved a move to allow EBCI Holdings a 48% minority stake, $25 million, in a quarter horse race track in Cannonsburg, Kentucky. On October 27, 2023, Sandy's Racing & Gaming officially opened, with the horse race track to open in 2025.

== Enrollment and government ==
In order to be enrolled in the EBCI, one must have at least one direct, lineal ancestor that appears on the 1924 Baker Roll of the Eastern Band of Cherokee Indians, and must possess at least 1/16 degree of Eastern Cherokee blood to meet the tribe's blood quantum requirement. This is different from the Cherokee Nation (headquartered in Oklahoma), which has no blood quantum requirements, instead requiring only lineal descent from one or more ancestors recorded on the Dawes Rolls (which recorded assumed or estimated blood quantum and race), an older roll than the 1924 Baker Roll. The United Keetoowah Band of Cherokee Indians in Oklahoma also requires a minimum blood quantum for enrollment and utilizes a different base roll.

The EBCI and other federally recognized Cherokee tribes have opposed recognition for other tribes, such as the Lumbee. Mark Edwin Miller states in his work that even "so-called purely 'descendancy' tribes such as the Five Tribes with no blood quantum requirement jealously guard some proven, documentary link by blood to distant ancestors. More than any single BIA requirement, however, this criterion has proven troublesome for southeastern groups [seeking federal recognition] because of its reliance on non-Indian records and the confused (and confusing) nature of surviving documents."

The government of the EBCI is divided into three branches: executive, legislative, and judicial. These consist of the principal chief and vice-chief, the unicameral Tribal Council, and the Cherokee courts. The EBCI Code of Ordinances delineates the structure and function of the tribal government. Elections are held on odd-numbered years, with the primary elections on the first Thursday in June and general elections on the first Thursday in September. To be an eligible voter to participate in the elections, the person must be: 1) an enrolled member of the Eastern Band of Cherokee Indians; 2) at least 18 years of age on the date of the applicable election; 3) registered with the tribe's Board of Elections.

=== Executive branch ===
The EBCI executive branch is governed by Chapter 117, Article I of the EBCI Code of Ordinances. Both the principal chief and the vice-chief are elected to a four-year by an at-large election. The duties of both elected officials are to represent and defend the rights, interests, lands and funds of the Tribe before any legislative committee or body of the federal or state governments. The principal chief also has veto authority on any resolution or ordinance enacted by the Tribal Council; and can appoint government division secretaries and members to the following organizations: Cherokee Police Commission, Kituwah Economic Development Board, and the Tribal Gaming Commission.

=== Legislative branch ===
The unicameral Tribal Council consists of 12 members, with two representatives elected from each community, except for Cherokee County and Snowbird, which share two representatives. Its authority to legislate and to conduct investigations and hearings comes from Chapter 117, Article II of the EBCI Code of Ordinances. It also has the sole power and authority to approve assignment and transfer of possessory rights to its lands among its members and has quasi-judicial powers to resolve disputes. The Tribal Council can also override a veto, with two-thirds majority, and can review some appointments by the principal chief. Members are elected to two-year terms and are assigned to boards and committees, which include planning, business, lands, community services, manpower, investment, education, and housing.

=== Judiciary ===
The EBCI tribal courts derive their authority from Chapter 7 of the EBCI Code of Ordinances; it consists of one supreme court (one chief justice and two associate justices), one trial court (one chief judge and two associate judges), and such other trial courts of special jurisdiction as established by law (e.g. juvenile court). All justices and judges are appointed upon nomination by the principal chief, and confirmed by the Tribal Council. The chief justice, chief judge, and associate judges for trial courts of special jurisdiction have six-year terms and are eligible for reappointment, while associate justices and associate judges of the trial court have four-year terms and are eligible for reappointment.

== Notable members ==
Video of Jerry Wolfe speaking in English and Cherokee

- Goingback Chiltoskey (1907–2000), woodcarver and educator
- Amanda Crowe (1928–2004), sculptor and educator
- Joyce Dugan (born 1952), educator and principal chief, first woman elected to this position
- Charles George (1932–1952), Medal of Honor recipient
- Edwin George (1934–2022), folk artist and muralist
- Shan Goshorn (1957–2018), visual artist
- Myrtle Driver Johnson (1944–), Beloved Woman and translator
- Will West Long (1869–1947), Cherokee mask maker, a translator, and a Cherokee cultural historian
- Henry McClain Owl (1895–1980) educator, activist, and historian
- Nimrod Jarrett Smith (1837–1893), Principal Chief
- Richard Sneed (born 1967), Principal Chief
- Lottie Queen Stamper (1907–1987), basket maker and educator
- Amanda Swimmer (1921–2018), potter, given the title of Beloved Woman
- William Holland Thomas (1805–1893), Principal Chief
- Maggie Axe Wachacha (1892–1993), tribal council clerk and Beloved Woman
- Jeremiah Wolfe (1924–2018), Cherokee stone carver, stickball caller, storyteller, veteran, and Beloved Man

== See also ==
- 2023 Eastern Band of Cherokee Indians Marijuana Legalization Measure
- Cherokee One Feather, newspaper serving the community
- Indigenous North American stickball
- Cherokee Preservation Foundation
- New Kituwah Academy
