= Qualla Boundary =

Land held in trust for the Cherokee of North Carolina

- Indian reserve
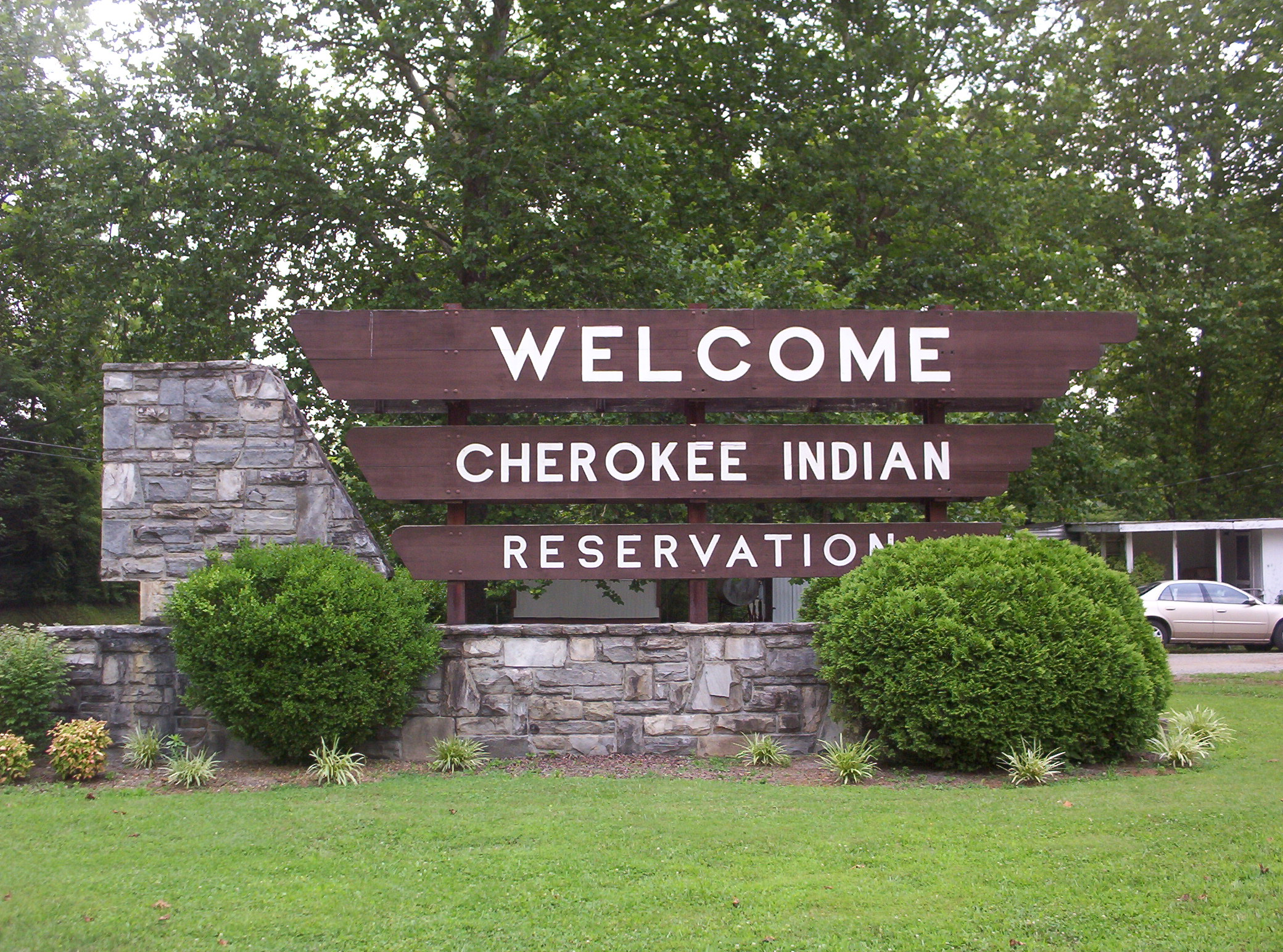
- "Welcome Cherokee Indian Reservation" sign

- Country: United States
- State: North Carolina
- Counties: Cherokee, Graham, Haywood, Jackson, Swain
- Established: 1876
- Added to Trust: 1924
- Named for: Old woman
- Government: Eastern Band of Cherokee Indians
- Time zone: UTC−5 (Eastern (EST))
  - Summer (DST): UTC−4 (EDT)
- Area code: 828
- GNIS feature ID: 1018039

The Qualla Boundary or The Qualla is territory held as a land trust by the United States government for the federally recognized Eastern Band of Cherokee Indians (EBCI), who reside in Western North Carolina. The area is part of the large historic Cherokee territory in the Southeast, which extended into eastern Tennessee, western South Carolina, northern Georgia, and Alabama. Currently, the largest contiguous portion of the Qualla lies in Haywood, Swain, and Jackson counties and is centered on the community of Cherokee, which serves as the tribal capital of the EBCI. Smaller, non-contiguous parcels also lie in Graham and Cherokee counties, near the communities of Snowbird and Murphy, respectively.

The tribe purchased this land in the 1870s, and it was subsequently placed under federal protective trust; it is not a reservation created by the government. Individuals can buy, own, and sell the land, provided they are enrolled members of EBCI tribe.

== Etymology ==
Qualla comes from the Cherokee word kwalli ('old woman'). It refers to Polly, an elder Cherokee woman who lived in the area.

== Location ==
The Qualla Boundary is located at 35°30′N 83°16′W. The main part of the Qualla Boundary lies in eastern Swain and northern Jackson counties (just south of Great Smoky Mountains National Park). A small portion of the main trust lands extends eastward into Haywood County. The trust lands include many smaller non-contiguous sections to the southwest in Marble, Hiwassee, and Hanging Dog areas of Cherokee County, and the Snowbird community in Graham County. The total land area of these regions is 213.934 km^{2} (82.6 sq mi), with a 2000 census resident population of 8,092 people.

== History ==
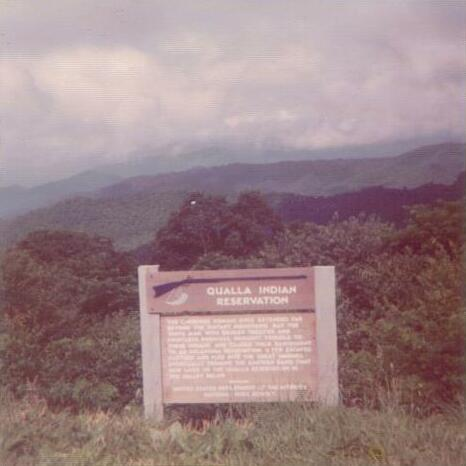
"Qualla Indian Reservation" sign in North Carolina; text of 1975 sign included in article

The Cherokee and their ancestors have long occupied the area, having migrated there centuries before Europeans arrived. During their colonial expansion west, European settlers sometimes came into conflict with the Cherokee, whose territory extended into present-day Tennessee and northern Georgia. After the late 18th century and warfare with American settlers during and after the Revolutionary War, many of the Cherokee moved farther south along the Tennessee River, into Georgia and westward into Alabama, establishing at least eleven new towns.

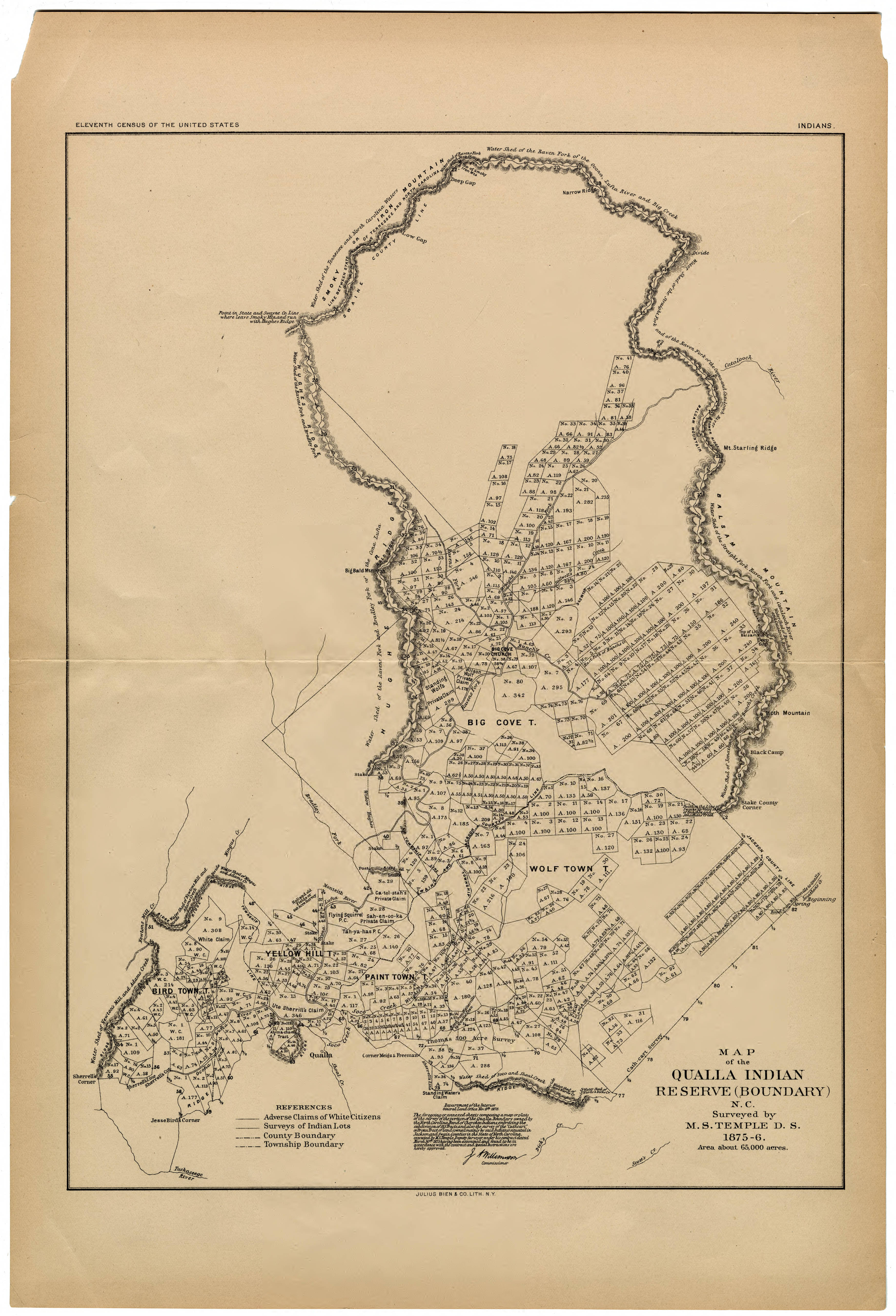
Map of the Qualla Indian Reserve (circa 1890)

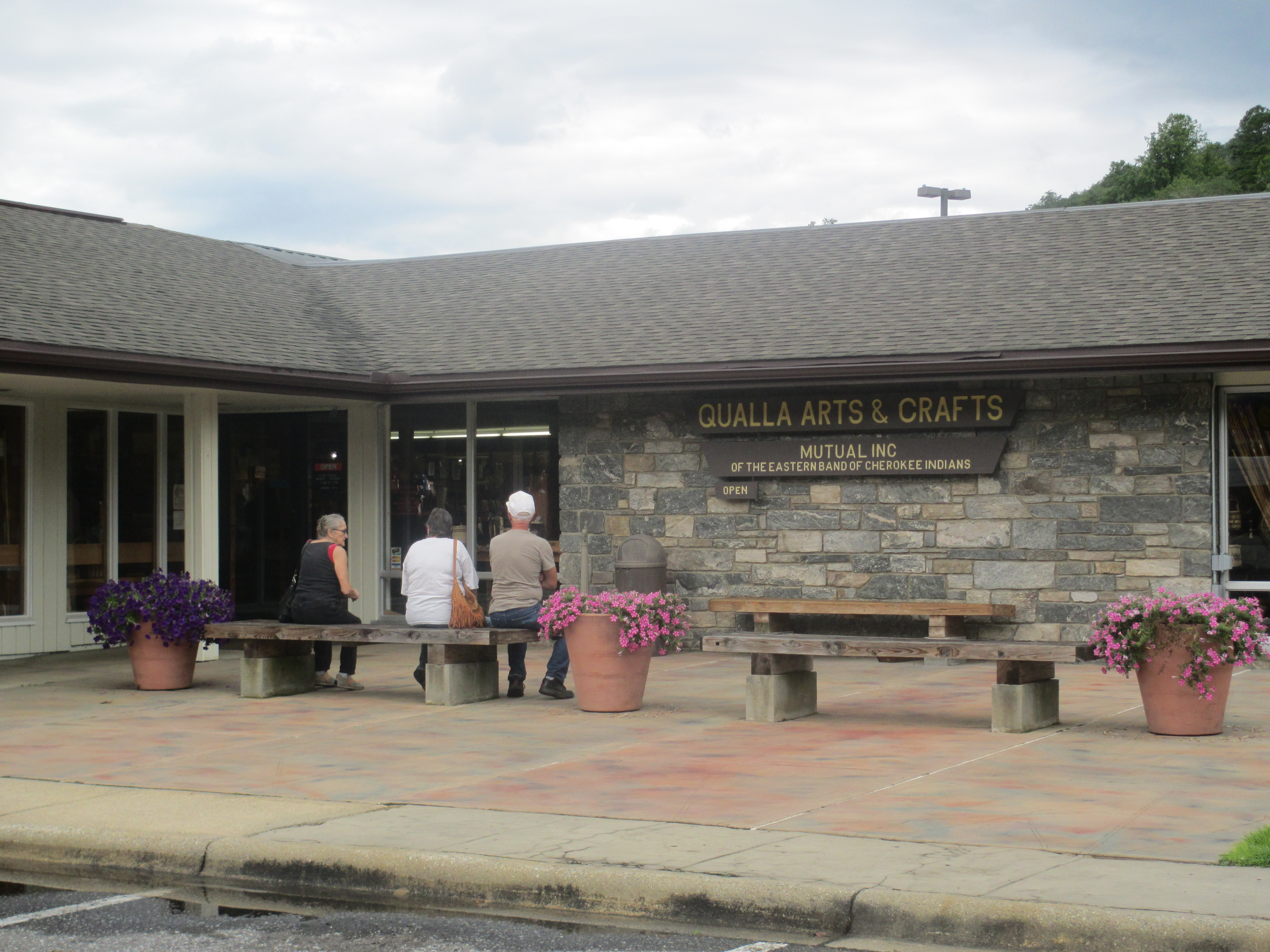
Qualla Arts and Crafts Center in Cherokee, North Carolina

The Cherokee were forcibly removed in the late 1830s from much of this area, especially the Black Belt in Georgia and Alabama, under federal authority as authorized by Congress in the 1830 Indian Removal Act. They were relocated to Indian Territory west of the Mississippi River, in what is the present-day state of Oklahoma.

During the winter of 1838 and early the spring of 1839, the U.S. Federal Government relocated approximately 11,000 Cherokee from their homeland in North Carolina, in what is known as the Trail of Tears. Some of the Cherokee were able to evade the initial removal and hide in the Great Smoky Mountains, some were free to stay on their lands because of earlier treaties, but the majority of the Cherokee people were removed from the land. This was when the main struggle for land at what became the Qualla Boundary began.

The Qualla Boundary was first surveyed in 1876 by M. S. Temple under the auspices of the United States Land Office. These pieces were embodied in a map published as the Map of the Qualla Indian reserve. The Qualla Boundary is a land trust supervised by the United States Bureau of Indian Affairs. The land is a fragment of the extensive historical homeland of the Cherokee in the region and was considered part of the Cherokee Nation during the 19th century, prior to certain treaties and Indian Removal in the 1830s. William Holland Thomas had lived and worked among the Cherokee people for a good portion of his life. He had a knowledge of their traditions and language and was close friends with some members of the tribe. The Cherokee valued and respected Thomas; he had studied law and was adopted into the tribe and named as successor by its hereditary chief. He is the only European American to have served as chief in their history.

Thomas purchased lands around the Oconaluftee River for the tribe, the total area adding up to around 50,000 acres; the purchased lands are a large part of what makes up the Boundary today. The Cherokee organized and formed a corporation in 1870 to be able to purchase and hold additional lands. The Cherokee who gained the ability to live in North Carolina were considered to be an independent band from the Cherokee Nation living in Oklahoma.

In the 1930s, the federal government requested the tribe to cede land for the construction of a new motorway, called the Blue Ridge Parkway, that would cut through the Qualla Boundary to end at the Great Smoky Mountains National Park. The tribe resisted the federal government, which initially wanted the land for free. In 1939, the tribe and the federal government reached an agreement and signed a pact for right-of-way acquisition; in return the federal government would make a $40,000 payment for the tribe's land, require the state to build a regular highway through the Soco Valley (US 19), and transfer two other parcels to the tribe, known as the Boundary Tree tract (north of US 441, near the national park entrance) and Ravensford tract (east of the Oconaluftee River and Raven Fork confluence). Two years later, the U.S. Congress decided not to give the tribe the Ravensford tract as stated in the pact. In 2003, the tribe negotiated a land swap with the federal government; this involved the tribe buying 218 acres (88 ha) near Waterrock Knob then trading it for the Ravensford tract. In 2009, Cherokee Central Schools opened a $140 million school campus on the Ravensford tract.

== Government and law ==
The tribal community functions like most municipalities, operating schools, law enforcement, and rescue services, in addition to their own hospital and gaming casino, known as Harrah's Cherokee. They have opened a second location of the casino on their land in Murphy, North Carolina. The tribe has operated a court system since 1987.

Tribal police have exclusive police jurisdiction on Indian lands. The FBI and other federal agencies have jurisdiction to handle certain major federal criminal offenses. N.C. State Highway Patrol, motor vehicle inspectors, wildlife officers, state alcohol agents, SBI agents, and other state peace officers assigned to counties that overlap with the Qualla Boundary can be called to assist tribal law enforcement officers, and can be commissioned as "special officers" of the Department of the Interior to assist in federal investigations. Non-tribal members charged with a crime in Qualla Boundary are referred to county courts.

=== Administrative divisions ===
The Qualla Boundary is divided into seven communities, which are similar to townships.

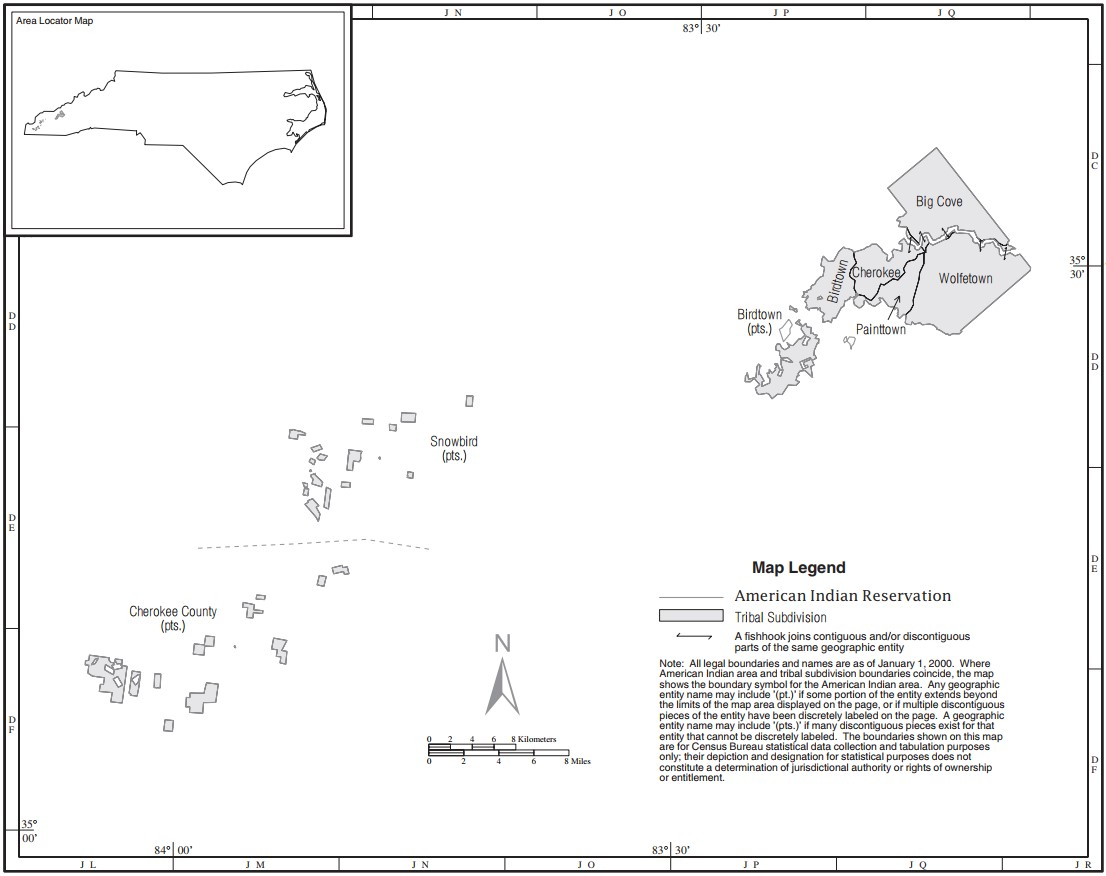
US Census map of Qualla Boundary with subdivisions

Community	Overlapping North Carolina counties
Big Cove	Swain County
Birdtown	Jackson County, Swain County
Cherokee County	Cherokee County
Painttown	Jackson County
Snowbird	Graham County
Wolftown	Haywood County, Jackson County, Swain County
Yellowhill	Swain County

There are no municipalities, instead each community elects two representatives to the tribal council; except for Cherokee County and Snowbird, which share two representatives to the tribal council. Cherokee, a census-designated place, overlaps most of Painttown and Yellowhill, with a small portion also in Wolftown.

== Education ==
From 1890 to 1954, the U.S. Indian Service (later renamed the Bureau of Indian Affairs) operated the Cherokee Boarding Schools in Cherokee. It replaced these with elementary day schools, located closer to students' homes in Big Cove, Soco, Birdtown, and Snowbird. In 1962 all elementary day schools were consolidated into Central Elementary School in Cherokee.

In 1975, Cherokee High School was opened with grades seven through twelve. In 1990 Cherokee Central Schools became a tribally operated school district, under a grant from the Bureau of Indian Affairs, with students assigned from Big Cove, Birdtown, Painttown, Wolftown, and Yellowhill communities. In 1996, the school district established the Kituwah curriculum for kindergarten through sixth grade, which incorporates the Cherokee language. Prior to this, the schools operated by the Bureau of Indian Affairs allowed only English to be used. In 2004, the EBCI established the New Kituwah Academy, a private bilingual Cherokee-English language immersion school for Cherokee students in kindergarten through sixth grade, located in the Yellowhill community.

In 1975 Western Carolina University opened its Cherokee Center in cooperation with the EBCI, which is the headquarters for outreach and involvement between residents in the Qualla Boundary and outside surrounding communities. It provides services including application process, transcript request, scholarships, internships placement, high school recruitment, as well as college level courses. The Cherokee Center is supported by an advisory board composed of representatives from the EBCI and Western Carolina University.

== Representation in media ==
In the mid-1950s, much of Disney's five-part television series, Davy Crockett (starring Fess Parker), was filmed here.

== See also ==
- Cherokee Preservation Foundation
