= CMAP =

CMAP may refer to:

- Chicago Metropolitan Agency for Planning
- Cmap (font)
- Concept map
- CmapTools, concept mapping software.
- CMap Software (Professional Services Automation (PSA) software)
- Compound muscle action potential
