= Cherokee (Unicode block) =

- Range: U+13A0..U+13FF (96 code points)
- Plane: BMP
- Scripts: Cherokee
- Major alphabets: Cherokee
- Assigned: 92 code points
- Unused: 4 reserved code points

Unicode Version History
- 3.0 (1999): 85 (+85)
- 8.0 (2015): 92 (+7)

Unicode documentation
- Code chart ∣ Web page

Graphical representation of the Cherokee and Cherokee Supplement Unicode blocks

Cherokee is a Unicode block containing the syllabic characters for writing the Cherokee language. When Cherokee was first added to Unicode in version 3.0 it was treated as a unicameral alphabet, but in version 8.0 it was redefined as a bicameral script. The Cherokee block (U+13A0 to U+13FF) contains all the uppercase letters plus six lowercase letters. The Cherokee Supplement block (U+AB70 to U+ABBF), added in version 8.0, contains the rest of the lowercase letters. For backwards compatibility, the Unicode case folding algorithm—which usually converts a string to lowercase characters—maps Cherokee characters to uppercase.

Cherokee^{[1]}^{[2]} Official Unicode Consortium code chart (PDF)
	0	1	2	3	4	5	6	7	8	9	A	B	C	D	E	F
U+13Ax	Ꭰ	Ꭱ	Ꭲ	Ꭳ	Ꭴ	Ꭵ	Ꭶ	Ꭷ	Ꭸ	Ꭹ	Ꭺ	Ꭻ	Ꭼ	Ꭽ	Ꭾ	Ꭿ
U+13Bx	Ꮀ	Ꮁ	Ꮂ	Ꮃ	Ꮄ	Ꮅ	Ꮆ	Ꮇ	Ꮈ	Ꮉ	Ꮊ	Ꮋ	Ꮌ	Ꮍ	Ꮎ	Ꮏ
U+13Cx	Ꮐ	Ꮑ	Ꮒ	Ꮓ	Ꮔ	Ꮕ	Ꮖ	Ꮗ	Ꮘ	Ꮙ	Ꮚ	Ꮛ	Ꮜ	Ꮝ	Ꮞ	Ꮟ
U+13Dx	Ꮠ	Ꮡ	Ꮢ	Ꮣ	Ꮤ	Ꮥ	Ꮦ	Ꮧ	Ꮨ	Ꮩ	Ꮪ	Ꮫ	Ꮬ	Ꮭ	Ꮮ	Ꮯ
U+13Ex	Ꮰ	Ꮱ	Ꮲ	Ꮳ	Ꮴ	Ꮵ	Ꮶ	Ꮷ	Ꮸ	Ꮹ	Ꮺ	Ꮻ	Ꮼ	Ꮽ	Ꮾ	Ꮿ
U+13Fx	Ᏸ	Ᏹ	Ᏺ	Ᏻ	Ᏼ	Ᏽ			ᏸ	ᏹ	ᏺ	ᏻ	ᏼ	ᏽ		
Notes 1.As of Unicode version 17.0 2.Grey areas indicate non-assigned code points

== History ==
The following Unicode-related documents record the purpose and process of defining specific characters in the Cherokee block:

Version	Final code points (Note: Proposed code points and characters names may differ from final code points and names)	Count	UTC ID	L2 ID	WG2 ID	Document
3.0	U+13A0..13F4	85	UTC/1991-102			McGowan, Rick (1991-10-24), Cherokee block description and chart draft
3.0	U+13A0..13F4	85	UTC/1995-027		N1172	Everson, Michael (1995-03-14), Proposal for encoding the Cherokee script
3.0	U+13A0..13F4	85	UTC/1995-xxx			"Cherokee Proposal", Unicode Technical Committee Meeting #65, Minutes, 1995-06-02
3.0	U+13A0..13F4	85	UTC/1996-016			Gourd, Charles (1996-03-05), Cherokee Syllabary
3.0	U+13A0..13F4	85	UTC/1996-015			Everson, Michael (1996-03-08), Re: Cherokee Nation's ordering
3.0	U+13A0..13F4	85	UTC/1996-017			Everson, Michael (1996-03-14), Proposal for encoding the Cherokee script
3.0	U+13A0..13F4	85			N1362	Initial comments on encoding Cherokee into ISO/IEC 10646, 1996-04-01
3.0	U+13A0..13F4	85		X3L2/96-034	N1356	Suignard, Michel (1996-04-17), US position concerning the referenced proposal to encode the Cherokee script
3.0	U+13A0..13F4	85			N1353	Umamaheswaran, V. S.; Ksar, Mike (1996-06-25), "8.11", Draft minutes of WG2 Copenhagen Meeting # 30
3.0	U+13A0..13F4	85	UTC/1996-027.2			Greenfield, Steve (1996-07-01), "B. Cherokee", UTC #69 Minutes (PART 2)
3.0	U+13A0..13F4	85			N1453	Ksar, Mike; Umamaheswaran, V. S. (1996-12-06), "8.12", WG 2 Minutes - Quebec Meeting 31
3.0	U+13A0..13F4	85			N1476	Paterson, Bruce (1996-12-09), Draft pDAM 12 - Cherokee
3.0	U+13A0..13F4	85			N1596	Summary of Voting on SC 2 N 2807, Combined PDAM Registration and FPDAM ballot: Amendment 12: Cherokee Script, 1997-06-17
3.0	U+13A0..13F4	85		L2/97-288	N1603	Umamaheswaran, V. S. (1997-10-24), "6.4", Unconfirmed Meeting Minutes, WG 2 Meeting # 33, Heraklion, Crete, Greece, 20 June – 4 July 1997
3.0	U+13A0..13F4	85		L2/98-130		Text for FDAM ballot ISO 10646 Amendment 12 - Cherokee, 1998-03-05
3.0	U+13A0..13F4	85		L2/14-026		Moore, Lisa (2014-02-17), "Motion 138-M2", UTC #138 Minutes, "Any proposal to make the Cherokee script bicameral, should make the existing Cherokee letters uppercase. The UTC deems that this choice would provide better backward compatibility with existing implementations."
8.0	U+13F5, 13F8..13FD	7		L2/13-190	N4487	Everson, Michael; Feeling, Durbin (2013-10-24), Proposal for the addition of Cherokee characters
8.0	U+13F5, 13F8..13FD	7		L2/13-210		Anderson, Deborah; Whistler, Ken; McGowan, Rick; Pournader, Roozbeh (2013-10-31), "3", Recommendations to UTC #137 November 2013 on Script Proposals
8.0	U+13F5, 13F8..13FD	7		L2/14-064R	N4537R	Everson, Michael (2014-02-25), Revised proposal for the addition of Cherokee characters
8.0	U+13F5, 13F8..13FD	7		L2/14-100		Moore, Lisa (2014-05-13), "Consensus 139-C13", UTC #139 Minutes
8.0	U+13F5, 13F8..13FD	7		L2/14-187		Whistler, Ken (2014-07-31), Cherokee casing decision may break identifier syntax
8.0	U+13F5, 13F8..13FD	7			N4553 (pdf, doc)	Umamaheswaran, V. S. (2014-09-16), "M62.07a", Minutes of WG 2 meeting 62 Adobe, San Jose, CA, USA
8.0	U+13F5, 13F8..13FD	7		L2/15-214		Lunde, Ken (2015-07-30), Phoreus Cherokee type specimen sheet
