= Cherokee Supplement =

- Range: U+AB70..U+ABBF (80 code points)
- Plane: BMP
- Scripts: Cherokee
- Major alphabets: Cherokee
- Assigned: 80 code points
- Unused: 0 reserved code points

Unicode Version History
- 8.0 (2015): 80 (+80)

Unicode documentation
- Code chart ∣ Web page

Graphical representation of the Cherokee and Cherokee Supplement Unicode blocks

Cherokee Supplement is a Unicode block containing the syllabic characters for writing the Cherokee language. When Cherokee was first added to Unicode in version 3.0 it was treated as a unicameral alphabet, but in version 8.0 it was redefined as a bicameral script. The Cherokee Supplement block contains lowercase letters only, whereas the Cherokee block contains all the uppercase letters, together with six lowercase letters. For backwards compatibility, the Unicode case folding algorithm—which usually converts a string to lowercase characters—maps Cherokee characters to uppercase.

Cherokee Supplement^{[1]} Official Unicode Consortium code chart (PDF)
	0	1	2	3	4	5	6	7	8	9	A	B	C	D	E	F
U+AB7x	ꭰ	ꭱ	ꭲ	ꭳ	ꭴ	ꭵ	ꭶ	ꭷ	ꭸ	ꭹ	ꭺ	ꭻ	ꭼ	ꭽ	ꭾ	ꭿ
U+AB8x	ꮀ	ꮁ	ꮂ	ꮃ	ꮄ	ꮅ	ꮆ	ꮇ	ꮈ	ꮉ	ꮊ	ꮋ	ꮌ	ꮍ	ꮎ	ꮏ
U+AB9x	ꮐ	ꮑ	ꮒ	ꮓ	ꮔ	ꮕ	ꮖ	ꮗ	ꮘ	ꮙ	ꮚ	ꮛ	ꮜ	ꮝ	ꮞ	ꮟ
U+ABAx	ꮠ	ꮡ	ꮢ	ꮣ	ꮤ	ꮥ	ꮦ	ꮧ	ꮨ	ꮩ	ꮪ	ꮫ	ꮬ	ꮭ	ꮮ	ꮯ
U+ABBx	ꮰ	ꮱ	ꮲ	ꮳ	ꮴ	ꮵ	ꮶ	ꮷ	ꮸ	ꮹ	ꮺ	ꮻ	ꮼ	ꮽ	ꮾ	ꮿ
Notes 1.As of Unicode version 17.0

== History ==
The following Unicode-related documents record the purpose and process of defining specific characters in the Cherokee Supplement block:

Version	Final code points (Note: Proposed code points and characters names may differ from final code points and names)	Count	L2 ID	WG2 ID	Document
8.0	U+AB70..ABBF	80	L2/13-200		Moore, Lisa (2013-11-18), "C.6.1", UTC #137 Minutes
8.0	U+AB70..ABBF	80	L2/14-064R	N4537R	Everson, Michael (2014-02-25), Revised proposal for the addition of Cherokee characters
8.0	U+AB70..ABBF	80	L2/14-100		Moore, Lisa (2014-05-13), "Consensus 139-C13", UTC #139 Minutes
8.0	U+AB70..ABBF	80		N4553 (pdf, doc)	Umamaheswaran, V. S. (2014-09-16), "M62.07b", Minutes of WG 2 meeting 62 Adobe, San Jose, CA, USA
