= Everson Mono =

Monospace Unicode font

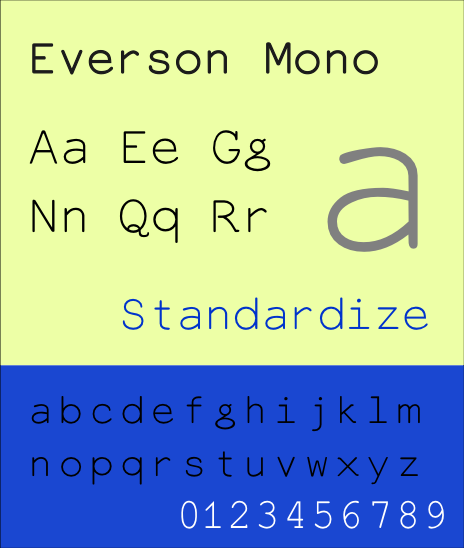
- Category: Sans-serif Monospaced
- Classification: Humanist
- Designer: Michael Everson
- Foundry: Evertype
- Date created: 1995
- License: Proprietary
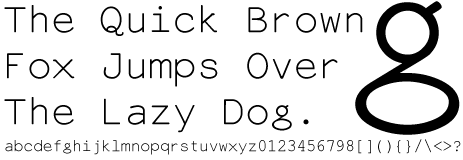
- Sample

Everson Mono is a monospaced humanist sans serif Unicode font whose development by Michael Everson began in 1995. Its signature feature is that it is a "monowidth" font (or "router"), whose glyphs are drawn solely with a single uniform-width line.

At first, Everson Mono was a collection of 8-bit fonts containing glyphs for tables in ISO/IEC 10646; at that time, it was not easy to edit cmaps to have true Unicode indices, and there were very few applications which could do anything with a font so encoded in any case. The original "Everson Mono" had a MacRoman character set, and other character sets were provided as separate files named with suffixes: "Everson Mono Latin B", "Everson Mono Currency", "Everson Mono Armenian" and so on. A range of fonts with the character set of the ISO/IEC 8859 series were also made. A single Unicode font file incorporating most or all of the characters from all of the previous separate Everson Mono files was named "Everson Mono Unicode" in 2003, but since 2008 the single large font has been named simply "Everson Mono". At present, there are regular, italic, bold, and bold-italic styles.

== Range, characters, version ==
Everson Mono version 7.0.0, dated 2014-12-04, contains 9,632 characters (9,659 glyphs). Previous major releases contained fewer characters: version 6.2.1, dated 2012-12-09, contained 9,288 characters (9,314 glyphs); version 5.1.5, dated 2008-12-07, contained 6,343 characters (6,350 glyphs); version 4.1.3, dated 2003-02-13, contained 4,893 characters (4,899 glyphs).

In short, this font covers the following scripts: Armenian, Canadian Syllabics, Cherokee, Cyrillic, Georgian, Greek (excepting Coptic), Hebrew, Latin, Ogham, Runic, see below for details.

Characters included in Unicode Ranges / Blocks
Block name (range)	Chars v.7.0.0	Chars. v.5.1.5	Chars. v.4.1.3
Basic Latin (0000–007F)	95	95	95
Latin-1 Supplement (0080–00FF)	96	96	96
Latin Extended-A (0100–017F)	128	128	128
Latin Extended-B (0180–024F)	208	208	183
IPA Extensions (0250–02AF)	96	96	96
Spacing Modifier Letters (02B0–02FF)	80	80	80
Combining Diacritical Marks (0300–036F)	112	113	107
Greek and Coptic (0370–03FF)	134	120	108
Cyrillic (0400–04FF)	256	256	246
Cyrillic Supplement (0500–052F)	48	40	16
Armenian (0530–058F)	89	86	86
Hebrew (0590–05FF)	87	87	82
Thaana (0780–07BF)	50	0	0
Samaritan (0800–083F)	61	61	0
Thai (0E00–0E7F)	87	0	0
Georgian (10A0–10FF)	88	83	80
Cherokee (13A0–13FF)	92	85	85
Unified Canadian Aboriginal Syllabics (1400–167F)	640	640	630
Ogham (1680–169F)	29	29	29
Runic (16A0–16FF)	89	81	81
Unified Canadian Aboriginal Syllabics Extended (18B0–18FF)	70	0	0
Combining Diacritical Marks Extended (1AB0–1AFF)	15	0	0
Phonetic Extensions (1D00–1D7F)	118	128	107
Phonetic Extensions Supplement (1D80–1DBF)	64	65	0
Combining Diacritical Marks Supplement (1DC0–1DFF)	58	42	0
Latin Extended Additional (1E00–1EFF)	256	256	246
Greek Extended (1F00–1FFF)	233	233	233
General Punctuation (2000–206F)	111	107	97
Superscripts and Subscripts (2070–209F)	42	34	29
Currency Symbols (20A0–20CF)	30	25	18
Combining Diacritical Marks for Symbols (20D0–20FF)	33	33	27
Letterlike Symbols (2100–214F)	80	80	74
Number Forms (2150–218F)	60	58	49
Arrows (2190–21FF)	112	112	112
Mathematical Operators (2200–22FF)	256	256	256
Miscellaneous Technical (2300–23FF)	256	219	207
Control Pictures (2400–243F)	39	39	39
Optical Character Recognition (2440–245F)	11	11	11
Enclosed Alphanumerics (2460–24FF)	160	160	159
Box Drawing (2500–257F)	128	128	128
Block Elements (2580–259F)	32	32	32
Geometric Shapes (25A0–25FF)	96	96	96
Miscellaneous Symbols (2600–26FF)	256	183	125
Dingbats (2700–27BF)	256	174	160
Miscellaneous Mathematical Symbols-A (27C0–27EF)	38	27	0
Supplemental Arrows-A (27F0–27FF)	16	16	0
Braille Patterns (2800–28FF)	256	0	0
Supplemental Arrows-B (2900–297F)	128	110	111
Supplemental Mathematical Operators (2A00–2AFF)	194	195	21
Miscellaneous Symbols and Arrows (2B00–2BFF)	1	0	0
Latin Extended-C (2C60–2C7F)	32	32	0
Coptic (2C80–2CFF)	251	0	0
Georgian Supplement (2D00–2D2F)	40	38	0
Tifinagh (2D30–2D7F)	59	55	0
Cyrillic Extended-A (2DE0–2DFF)	32	16	0
Supplemental Punctuation (2E00–2E7F)	54	50	0
Lisu (A4D0–A4FF)	48	0	0
Cyrillic Extended-B (A640–A69F)	96	80	0
Latin Extended-D (A720–A7FF)	160	115	0
Rejang (A930-A95F)	37	0	0
Latin Extended-E (AB30-AB6F)	54	0	0
Private Use Area (E000–F8FF)	Several	1	0
Alphabetic Presentation Forms (FB00–FB4F)	58	58	58
Variation Selectors (FE00–FE0F)	16	16	1
Combining Half Marks (FE20–FE2F)	16	7	4
Specials (FFF0–FFFF)	5	5	5
Linear B Syllabary (10000–1007F)	88	88	0
Linear B Ideograms (10080–100FF)	123	123	0
Aegean Numbers (10100–1013F)	57	57	0
Ancient Greek Numbers (10140–1018F)	77	43	0
Ancient Symbols (10190–101CF)	13	12	0
Phaistos Disc (101D0–101FF)	46	46	0
Lycian (10280–1029F)	29	29	0
Carian (102A0–102DF)	49	49	0
Old Italic (10300-1032F)	36	0	0
Gothic (10330–1034F)	27	27	0
Old Permic (10350–1037F)	43	0	0
Ugaritic (10380–1039F)	31	0	0
Deseret (10400–1044F)	80	80	0
Shavian (10450–1047F)	48	48	0
Osmanya (10480–104AF)	40	0	0
Cypriot Syllabary (10800–1083F)	55	55	0
Imperial Aramaic (10840–1085F)	31	0	0
Nabataean (10880–108AF)	40	0	0
Phoenician (10900–1091F)	29	0	0
Lydian (10920–1093F)	27	0	0
Old South Arabian (10A60–10A7F)	32	0	0
Old Turkic (10C00–10C4F)	73	0	0
Ancient Greek Musical Notation (1D200–1D24F)	70	70	0
Tai Xuan Jing Symbols (1D300–1D35F)	87	0	0
Mathematical Alphanumeric Symbols (1D400–1D7FF)	996	0	0
Mahjong Tiles (1F000–1F02F)	44	0	0
Domino Tiles (1F030–1F09F)	100	0	0
Alchemical Symbols (1F700–1F77F)	116	0	0

== Licensing ==
Everson Mono is offered without restriction from Everson's Web site. To use the font in any substantial way for personal or commercial purposes, Everson requires a €25.00 license fee, which covers up to three computers; anyone seeking to redistribute the font must seek express personal permission from Everson, and any use of the font on more than three computers also requires a custom license. Everson forbids any and all derivative works or alterations of the font.

== See also ==
- List of typefaces
- Unicode typefaces (Information and comparison on major fonts)
