= Margaret Bender =

American anthropologist

Margaret Clelland Bender is an American anthropologist who specializes in the language and culture of the Cherokee people. She received her Ph.D. in 1996 from the University of Chicago, where she studied with the anthropologist Raymond D. Fogelson. She is currently Associate Professor of anthropology and Chair of the Anthropology Department at Wake Forest University.

== Works ==
- (2003) Signs of Cherokee Culture: Sequoyah's Syllabary in Eastern Cherokee Life. University of North Carolina Press.
- (2008) Speaking Difference to Power: The Importance of Linguistic Sovereignty. Foundations of First Peoples' Sovereignty Press.
- (2009) Native American Language Ideologies: Beliefs, Practices, and Struggles in Indian Country. Duke University Press.
- (2010) Reflections on What Writing Means Beyond What it 'Says': The Political Economy and Semiotics of Graphic Pluralism in the Americas. University of Arizona Press.

== Sources ==
- Kan, Sergei A., and Pauline Turner Strong, eds. (2006) New Perspectives on Native North America: Cultures, Histories, and Representations. Lincoln: University of Nebraska Press.
