= Labiovelar consonant =

Labiovelar consonant may refer to:

- A labial–velar consonant such as [k͡p] (a consonant made at two places of articulation, one at the lips and the other at the soft palate)
- A labialized velar consonant such as [kʷ] or [w] (a consonant with an approximant-like secondary articulation)

== See also ==
- A bilabial consonant may be velarized such as [pʷ] or [mʷ] (also a consonant with an approximant-like secondary articulation)
- Velar consonants and velarization
- Labial consonants, especially bilabial consonants, and labialization
