= Cmap (font) =

The cmap table is one of the OpenType font tables, which are required to enable correct font functioning. It "defines the mapping of character codes to the glyph index values used in the font."
