= Battle of Fort Stedman order of battle: Confederate =

The following Confederate States Army units and commanders fought in the Battle of Fort Stedman on March 25, 1865. The Union order of battle is listed separately.

== Abbreviations used ==
=== Military rank ===
- Gen = General
- LTG = Lieutenant General
- MG = Major General
- BG = Brigadier General
- Col = Colonel
- Ltc = Lieutenant Colonel
- Maj = Major
- Cpt = Captain
- Lt = Lieutenant

=== Other ===
- w = wounded
- mw = mortally wounded
- k = killed

== Second Corps, Army of Northern Virginia ==
MG John B. Gordon

Division	Brigade	Regiments and Others
Rodes' Division; MG Bryan Grimes	Battle's Brigade Col Samuel B. Pickens	3rd Alabama Infantry: Cpt Cornelius Robinson, Jr.; 5th Alabama Infantry: Col Edwin L. Hobson, Cpt Thomas M. Riley; 6th Alabama Infantry: Maj Isaac M. Culver; 12th Alabama Infantry: Cpt Poleman D. Ross; 61st Alabama Infantry: Cpt Augustus P. Fannin
Rodes' Division; MG Bryan Grimes	Grimes' Brigade Col David G. Cowand	32nd North Carolina Infantry: Maj John W. Rierson (mw); 43rd North Carolina Infantry: Cpt Cary Whitaker; 45th North Carolina Infantry: Col John R. Winston; 53rd North Carolina Infantry: Col James T. Morehead, Jr. (c); 2nd North Carolina Infantry Battalion
Rodes' Division; MG Bryan Grimes	Cox's Brigade BG William Ruffin Cox	1st North Carolina Infantry; 2nd North Carolina Infantry: Maj James T. Scales; 3rd North Carolina: Ltc William M. Parsley; 4th North Carolina Infantry; 14th North Carolina Infantry: Ltc William A. Johnston; 30th North Carolina Infantry: Cpt David C. Allen
Rodes' Division; MG Bryan Grimes	Cook's Brigade BG Philip Cook (w); Col Edwin A. Nash	4th Georgia Infantry: Col Edwin A. Nash; 12th Georgia Infantry: Cpt Oliver F. Evans (w); 21st Georgia Infantry: Cpt Edward Smith; 44th Georgia Infantry: Cpt Thomas R. Daniel (c)
Rodes' Division; MG Bryan Grimes		Divisional Sharpshooters: Col Hamilton A. Brown (c)
Early's Division; BG James A. Walker	Johnston's Brigade BG Robert D. Johnston (w); Col John W. Lea	5th North Carolina Infantry: Col John W. Lea, Maj James M. Taylor; 12th North Carolina Infantry: Maj Robert W. Alston (w), Maj Kemp Plummer (w); 20th North Carolina Infantry: Col Thomas F. Toon (w), Maj Duncan Devane; 23rd North Carolina Infantry: Cpt Abner D. Peace; 1st North Carolina Infantry Battalion: Lt Richard W. Woodruff
Early's Division; BG James A. Walker	Lewis' Brigade BG William G. Lewis; Cpt John Beard	6th North Carolina Infantry: Ltc Samuel McDowell Tate; 21st North Carolina Infantry: Maj James F. Beall (w); 54th North Carolina Infantry: Cpt Augustus H. Martin; 57th North Carolina Infantry: Col Hamilton C. Jones (w), Cpt, John Beard, Cpt Philip Carpenter
Early's Division; BG James A. Walker	Pegram's Brigade Ltc John G. Kasey (c); Maj Henry Kyd Douglas	13th Virginia Infantry: Cpt George Cullen; 31st Virginia Infantry: Cpt Nathan Clawson; 49th Virginia Infantry: Cpt William D. Moffet (w), Cpt Robert D. Funkhouser (c); 52nd Virginia Infantry: Cpt Samuel W. Paxton (w); 58th Virginia Infantry: Cpt Samuel S. Turner
Gordon's Division; BG Clement A. Evans	Evans' Brigade Col John H. Baker (w); Col John H. Lowe	13th Georgia Infantry: Cpt Divany A. Kidd (k); 26th Georgia Infantry: Cpt James Knox; 31st Georgia Infantry: Col John H. Lowe; 38th Georgia Infantry: Ltc Philip E. Davant; 60th-61st Georgia Infantry: Col Walter B. Jones; 12th Georgia Infantry Battalion: Cpt Samuel H. Crump
Gordon's Division; BG Clement A. Evans	Terry's Brigade BG William Terry (w); Col John D. Whitehead	2nd Virginia Infantry: Cpt Joseph J. Jenkins; 4th Virginia Infantry: Cpt Hamilton D. Wade; 5th Virginia Infantry; 10th Virginia Infantry; 21st Virginia Infantry: Cpt Reuben J. Jordan; 23rd Virginia Infantry: Ltc John P. Fitzgerald; 25th Virginia Infantry: Col Norvell Cobb; 27th Virginia Infantry: Ltc Charles L. Haynes; 33rd Virginia Infantry; 37th Virginia Infantry: Col Titus V. Williams; 42nd Virginia Infantry: Maj Jesse Richardson (w); 44th Virginia Infantry: Cpt William A. Gilliam; 48th Virginia Infantry: Col Robert H. Dungan
Gordon's Division; BG Clement A. Evans	York's Brigade Ltc Eugene Waggaman	1st Louisiana Infantry; 2nd Louisiana Infantry; 5th Louisiana Infantry; 6th Louisiana Infantry; 7th Louisiana Infantry; 8th Louisiana Infantry; 9th Louisiana Infantry; 10th Louisiana Infantry: Ltc Henry Monier; 14th Louisiana Infantry; 15th Louisiana Infantry

== Fourth Corps ==
Division	Brigade	Regiments and Others
Johnson's Division; MG Bushrod Johnson	Wise's Brigade BG Henry A. Wise	26th Virginia Infantry: Maj William K. Perrin; 34th Virginia Infantry: Ltc Randolph Harrison; 46th Virginia Infantry: Cpt John H. White; 59th Virginia Infantry: Maj Robert G. Mosby
Johnson's Division; MG Bushrod Johnson	Wallace's Brigade BG William H. Wallace	17th South Carolina Infantry: Col Fitz William McMaster; 18th South Carolina Infantry: Ltc William B. Allison; 22nd South Carolina Infantry: Col William G. Burt; 23rd South Carolina Infantry: Col Henry L. Benbow; 26th South Carolina Infantry: Ltc Joshua Hilary Hudson; Holcombe (South Carolina) Legion: Col William J. Crawley
Johnson's Division; MG Bushrod Johnson	Moody's Brigade BG Young M. Moody	41st Alabama Infantry: Col Martin L. Stansel; 43rd Alabama Infantry: Maj William J. Mims; 59th Alabama Infantry: Ltc Daniel S. Troy; 60th Alabama Infantry: Col John W.A. Sanford; 23rd Alabama Infantry Battalion: Maj Nicholas Stallworth
Johnson's Division; MG Bushrod Johnson	Ransom's Brigade BG Matt W. Ransom; Col Henry M. Rutledge	24th North Carolina Infantry: Ltc John L. Harris (w); 25th North Carolina Infantry: Col Henry M. Rutledge; 35th North Carolina Infantry: Col James T. Johnston (c); 49th North Carolina Infantry: Col Leroy M. McAfee (w), Ltc James T. Davis (k), Cpt Henry A. Chambers; 56th North Carolina Infantry: Maj John W. Graham (w)
Artillery	Blount's Battalion	Marshall's (Virginia) Battery: Cpt William C. Marshall

== Reserve ==
Division	Brigade	Regiments and Others
From Third Corps	Cooke's Brigade, Heth's Division BG John R. Cooke	15th North Carolina Infantry: Ltc Gray W. Hammon; 27th North Carolina Infantry: Maj Joseph C. Webb; 46th North Carolina Infantry: Col William L. Saunders; 48th North Carolina Infantry: Col Samuel H. Walkup; 55th North Carolina Infantry: Cpt John T. Peden
From Third Corps	McComb's Brigade, Heth's Division BG William McComb	2nd Maryland Infantry Battalion: Cpt John W. Torsch; 1st Tennessee Infantry (Provisional Army): Maj Felix G. Buchanan; 7th Tennessee Infantry: Ltc Samuel G. Shepard; 14th Tennessee Infantry: Maj James H. Johnson; 17th-23rd Tennessee Infantry: Col Horace Ready; 25th-44th Tennessee Infantry: Cpt Jonathan E. Spencer; 63rd Tennessee Infantry: Cpt John W. Robertson
From Third Corps	Lane's Brigade, Wilcox's Division BG James H. Lane; Col John D. Barry	18th North Carolina Infantry: Col John D. Barry, Ltc John W. McGill; 28th North Carolina Infantry: Cpt T. James Linbarger; 33rd North Carolina Infantry: Col Robert V. Cowan; 37th North Carolina Infantry: Maj Jackson L. Bost
From Third Corps	Thomas' Brigade, Wilcox's Division BG Edward L. Thomas	14th Georgia Infantry: Col Richard P. Lester; 35th Georgia Infantry: Col Bolling H. Holt; 45th Georgia Infantry: Col Thomas J. Simmons; 49th Georgia Infantry: Col John T. Jordon; 3rd Company, Washington Artillery: Lt Frank McElroy
From W.H.F. Lee's Division, Cavalry Corps	Dearing's Brigade BG James Dearing	8th Georgia Cavalry; 4th North Carolina Cavalry; 16th North Carolina Cavalry
