= Nimrod Jarrett Smith =

Cherokee leader (1832–1893)

- Ꮳꮃꮧꭿ (Tsaladihi)
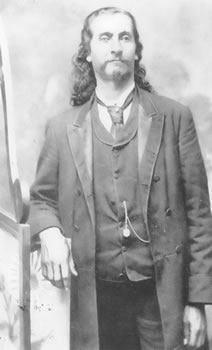

Principal Chief of the Eastern Band of Cherokee Indians
- In office 1880–1891
- Preceded by: Lloyd R. Welch
- Succeeded by: Stillwell Saunooke

Personal details
- Born: January 3, 1832 Murphy, North Carolina, U.S.
- Died: August 2, 1893 (aged 61)
- Resting place: Yellow Hill Cemetery; Cherokee, North Carolina

Military service
- Allegiance: Confederate States
- Branch/service: Confederate States Army
- Years of service: 1861–1865 (CSA)
- Rank: First Sergeant
- Battles/wars: American Civil War

Nimrod Jarrett Smith (1832–1893), also called Ꮳꮃꮧꭿ (Tsaladihi) (from the Cherokee pronunciation of the name "Jarrett"), was the fourth Principal Chief of the Eastern Band of Cherokee Indians. He is credited with gaining approval by the North Carolina legislature for the band's incorporation as a legal entity, and for gaining federal recognition as an Indian tribe.

== Early life and education ==
He was born into a Cherokee family in 1832 located in western North Carolina, part of a band that remained in the state during and after the period of Indian Removal. Cherokee from most of the towns in the American Southeast were forced to Indian Territory west of the Mississippi River.

His Cherokee mother was married to Henry Smith, a mixed-race Cherokee who owned land along the Valley River. Henry Smith served as an interpreter and translator for Reverend Evan Jones at the old Valley town mission. Henry Smith was one of the wealthiest men in the Eastern Cherokee Band (it was known in relation to the majority of the tribe that moved west.)

Nimrod Smith had many connections to other Cherokee leaders through his paternal grandmother, Sarah Susan Watie. He was the great-grandson of David Watie, making him the great-grand-nephew of Major Ridge, first cousin twice-removed of John Ridge, and the grand-nephew of Stand Watie and Elias Boudinot. As the Cherokee have a matrilineal kinship system, he would have been considered born into his mother's clan and generally taken his status from her. The tribe also was influenced by European-American patriarchal traditions.

== Career ==
During this period, the Cherokee remaining in North Carolina were treated as US and state citizens. They generally supported the Confederacy during the American Civil War. Nimrod Smith served the Confederacy as First Sergeant of B Company in the Cherokee Battalion of Thomas' Legion of Cherokee Indians and Highlanders, under the command of Principal Chief William Holland Thomas.

A well-educated and well-spoken man, Smith was fluent in both Cherokee and English, having learned Cherokee as a second language. He was elected Principal Chief in 1880 upon the death of his immediate predecessor, Lloyd Welch. He exercised unprecedented power over and influence among the Eastern Cherokee. He worked actively to gain official U.S. government recognition for the band as a tribe under federal law and was successful.

In 1887, Smith was host to ethnologist James Mooney during Mooney's first visit to the Eastern Band in western North Carolina. During that year, Mooney observed a Green Corn Dance; it was the last such ritual to be performed by the tribe for over a century.

Jarrett Smith was an anti-assimilationist, fighting against acculturation into white American society. At the same time, he participated in a local chapter of the Freemasons, a fraternal society. He is credited with gaining incorporation of the Eastern Band as a legal entity by the North Carolina General Assembly.

== Marriage and family ==
He married a white woman and they had two sons and three daughters who survived him. They lived in Swain County. His descendants continued to be influential in the tribe.

He died on August 2, 1893, and was buried with Masonic honors at Yellow Hill.
