= Battle of Fort Stedman order of battle =

The order of battle for the Battle of Fort Stedman (also known as the Battle of Hare's Hill) includes:

- Battle of Fort Stedman order of battle: Confederate
- Battle of Fort Stedman order of battle: Union
