= Salonitah =

First elected Principal Chief of the Eastern Band of Cherokee Indians

Principal Chief of the Eastern Band of Cherokee Indians
- In office 1870–1875
- Preceded by: Yonaguska
- Succeeded by: Lloyd Welch

Personal details
- Born: 1796
- Died: 1880 (aged 83–84)

Salonitah, or Flying Squirrel, was the second Principal Chief of the Eastern Band of Cherokee Indians, from 1870 to 1875, and first chief elected under the new Cherokee constitution.

== Career ==
Salonitah first appeared in records during the pursuit of Tsali during Cherokee removal in 1838; he was the leader of a group of Cherokees who went out to hunt for Tsali for the U.S. Army. Upon Yonaguska's passing in 1839, Salonitah, who at this point was Chief of Paint Town, laid claim as Chief of the Qualla Cherokee (though not fully recognized by all); while William Holland Thomas, who was chosen by Yonaguska as the next Principal Chief, became a key liaison between the whites and Cherokee. The justification given was that Salonitah was very suspicious of whites who claimed to speak for the Cherokees, especially William Holland Thomas.

In 1868, U.S. Congress officially recognized the Eastern Band Cherokee as a separate entity from their brethren in Oklahoma. On November 26, 1870, a grand council was organized to appoint a chairman, clerks, and delegates for a new council. On December 1, the council convened, approving the new constitution for the Eastern Band of Cherokee Indians and electing Salonitah as Principal Chief and John Jackson as second Chief.

== Death ==
According to the mortality schedule of the 1880 U.S. Census, Salonitah died of typhoid in April 1880.

Preceded by Yonaguska	Chief of the Eastern Band of Cherokee Indians; 1870–1875	Succeeded by Lloyd Welch
