= Alfred Iverson =

Alfred Iverson may refer to:

- Alfred Iverson Sr., U.S. senator from Georgia
- Alfred Iverson Jr., Confederate general during the American Civil War
