= 6th North Carolina Infantry Regiment =

Infantry regiment of the Confederate States Army

- Active: May 16, 1861 - April 9, 1865
- Country: Confederate States of America
- Allegiance: North Carolina
- Branch: Confederate States Army
- Type: Infantry
- Role: Infantry Regiment
- Motto: "Deeds Not Words"

Commanders
- General: Robert E. Lee
- Colonel: Charles F. Fisher
- Lieut. Colonel: Samuel McDowell Tate

The Sixth North Carolina Regiment was organized on the 16th of May 1861, at Company Shops now commonly known as Burlington, North Carolina. Charles F. Fisher would assume command as Colonel of the Regiment.

The Sixth would earn the name "The Bloody Sixth" through tough marches and exhausting battles during the War. The Sixth Regiment was prominent in the campaigns of the army from Seven Pines to Mine Run, then was active in the battles of Plymouth and Cold Harbor. It fought with Early in the Shenandoah Valley and later in the Appomattox operations. The regiment reported 23 killed and 50 wounded at First Manassas, and in April 1862, contained 715 effectives. It lost 115 during the Seven Days' Battles, 147 at Second Manassas and Ox Hill, 125 in the Maryland Campaign, and 25 at Fredericksburg. Of the 509 engaged at Gettysburg, thirty-six percent were disabled. At the Rappahannock River in November 1863, it lost 5 killed, 15 wounded, and 317 missing, and there were 6 killed and 29 wounded at Plymouth. It surrendered with 6 officers and 175 men of which 72 were armed.

== Organization and companies ==
Colonels:

- Charles Frederick Fisher (KIA, July 21, 1861)
- William Dorsey Pender (1861-1862)
- Isaac Erwin Avery (1862-KIA July 3,1863)
- Robert Fulton Webb (1863 - POW November 1863)

Following them are the companies:

- Company A - Caswell & Chatham County "Jackson Rangers", Capt. Robert M. McKinney
- Company B - Orange County "Flat River Guards", Capt. Robert F. Webb
- Company C - Orange County, "Orange Greys", Capt. William Johnson Freeland
- Company D - Burke, Catawba & McDowell County, Capt. Samuel McDowell Tate
- Company E - Burke, McDowell, Mitchell & Yancey County, Capt. Isaac Erwin Avery
- Company F - Alamance County "Hawfield River Boys", Capt. James W. Wilson
- Company G - Rowan & Mecklenburg County, Capt. James A. Craige
- Company H - Caswell County "Caswell Boys", Capt. Alfred A. Mitchell
- Company I - Wake & Chatham County "North Carolina Grays", Capt. Richard W. York
- Company K - Alamance County "Flat Bottom Boys", Capt. James W. Lea

== Battles ==
=== 1861- ===
- Battle of Manassas (Colonel Fisher Killed)

==== 1862- ====
Peninsula Campaign (March -July):

- Yorktown
- Eltham's Landing
- Barhamsville
- Seven Pines
- Gains Mill
- Savage's Station
- White Oak Swamp
- Malvern Hill
- Harrisons Landing

Cont. (July -December)

- Throughfare Gap
- Second Manassas
- Ox Hill
- Boonesboro (1862)
- Sharpsburg
- Fredericksburg

==== 1863- ====
- 2nd Fredericksburg/Chancellorsville
- 2nd Winchester
- Gettysburg
- Hagerstown
- Bristoe Station
- Mine Run
- 2nd Rappahannock Station

==== 1864- ====
- Batchelder's Creek (New Bern)
- Plymouth/Fort Gray/Fort Wessells/ Fort Williams
- Bathsheda Church
- Lynchburg
- Monocacey
- Fort Stevens
- Rutherford's Farm
- 2nd Kernstown
- 3rd Winchester
- Fisher's Hill
- Cedar Creek

==== 1865- ====
- Burgess' Mill
- Fort Steadman
- Sayler's Creek

== See also ==
- List of North Carolina Confederate Civil War units
