= 17th North Carolina Infantry Regiment =

Infantry regiment of the Confederate States Army

- Active: June 1861 to April 26, 1865
- Country: Confederate States of America
- Allegiance: Confederate States Army
- Branch: Infantry
- Engagements: Battle of Hatteras Inlet Batteries; Battle of New Bern (1864); Bermuda Hundred Campaign; Wilmington Campaign; Battle of Bentonville

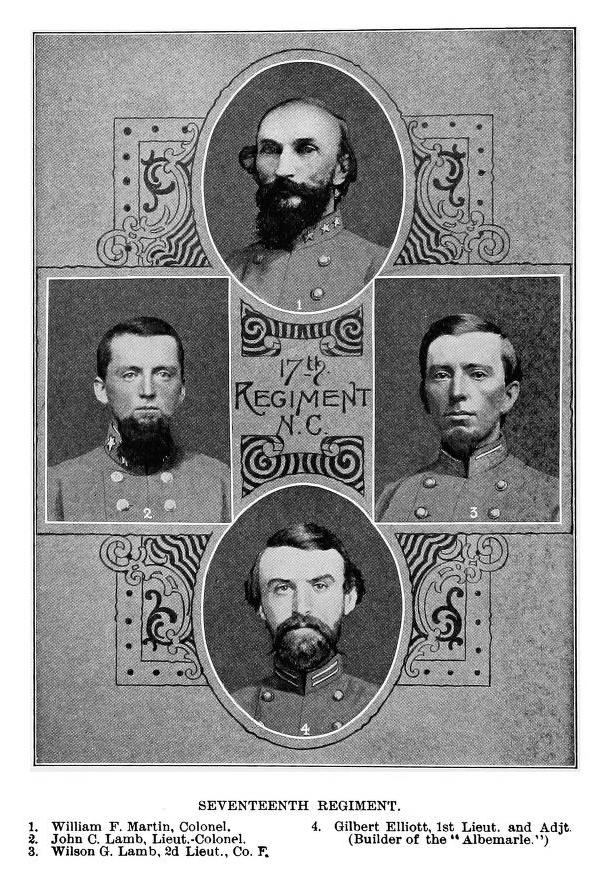
Officers of the 17th North Carolina Infantry Regiment

The 17th North Carolina Infantry Regiment was an infantry regiment that served in the Confederate States Army during the American Civil War. It served in North Carolina and Virginia.

== History ==
The regiment was recruited from Pasquotank, Edgecombe, Hertford, Bertie, Currituck, and Beaufort counties in northeastern North Carolina. W. F. Martin was the regiment's colonel, with George W. Johnson as lieutenant colonel and Henry A. Gilliam as major. The regiment was captured in August 1861 at the Battle of Hatteras Inlet Batteries. After being held prisoners of war at Fort Columbus on Governors Island in New York harbor and Fort Warren in Boston harbor and the survivors of the regiment were exchanged, it was reorganized with Martin remaining colonel, John C. Lamb becoming lieutenant colonel, and Thomas H. Sharp becoming major. In this second organization several companies were infused with reinforcements, including Company L which included new enlistments of many older men from Cabarrus, Union and Stanly counties.

The regiment continued to be stationed in eastern North Carolina and fought in several small skirmishes as part of James G. Martin's brigade. It participated in the operations to recapture New Bern in 1864. In May it was transferred with the rest of the brigade to Virginia, where it fought in the Bermuda Hundred Campaign. Lamb was mortally wounded during the campaign and Sharp was promoted to lieutenant colonel in his place, with Captain Lucius J. Johnson of Company L promoted to major. The regiment then fought at the Battle of Cold Harbor and then in the Siege of Petersburg, as part of Robert F. Hoke's division.

The regiment then fought in the Wilmington Campaign in North Carolina, followed by the Battle of Bentonville. It surrendered with the rest of the Army of Tennessee at the Bennett Place on April 26, 1865. However, the Regiment was strung out for many miles to the west. Several companies were discharged at Centre Church in Randolph County.

== See also ==
- List of North Carolina Confederate Civil War units
