= List of Confederate units from North Carolina in the American Civil War =

Flag of North Carolina during the American Civil War

This is a list of Confederate units from North Carolina in the American Civil War. Local organizations (State Troops, Home Guard, militia) that served North Carolina rather than the Confederate Army are also included here. The list of North Carolina Union Civil War regiments is shown separately.

== Confederate army ==
=== Infantry ===
- 1st Volunteers (Bethel Regiment, 6 months troops)
- 1st Infantry
- 2nd Infantry
- 3rd Infantry
- 4th Infantry
- 5th Infantry
- 6th Infantry
- 7th Infantry
- 8th Infantry
- 11th Infantry
- 12th Infantry
- 13th Infantry
- 14th Infantry
- 15th Infantry
- 16th Infantry
- 17th Infantry
- 18th Infantry
- 20th Infantry
- 21st Infantry
- 22nd Infantry
- 23rd Infantry
- 24th Infantry
- 25th Infantry
- 26th Infantry
- 27th Infantry
- 28th Infantry
- 29th Infantry
- 30th Infantry
- 31st Infantry
- 32nd Infantry
- 33rd Infantry
- 34th Infantry
- 35th Infantry
- 37th Infantry
- 38th Infantry
- 39th Infantry
- 42nd Infantry
- 43rd Infantry
- 44th Infantry
- 45th Infantry
- 46th Infantry
- 47th Infantry
- 48th Infantry
- 49th Infantry
- 50th Infantry
- 51st Infantry
- 52nd Infantry
- 53rd Infantry
- 54th Infantry
- 55th Infantry
- 56th Infantry
- 57th Infantry
- 58th Infantry
- 60th Infantry
- 61st Infantry
- 62nd Infantry
- 64th Infantry (11th Battalion, Allen's Regiment)
- 66th Infantry
- 67th Infantry
- 68th Infantry
- 69th Infantry (see Thomas' Legion)
- 1st Battalion, Infantry (see 32nd Infantry)
- 2nd Battalion, Infantry
- 6th Battalion, Infantry (Cohoon's Battalion, Virginia Infantry)
- 9th Battalion, Infantry (1st Sharpshooters)
- 13th Battalion, Infantry (see 66th Infantry)
- 18th Battalion, Infantry (McRae's)
- Davidson's Battalion, Infantry (see 7th Infantry)

=== Cavalry ===
- 1st Cavalry (9th State Troops)
- 2nd Cavalry (19th State Troops)
- 3rd Cavalry (41st State Troops)
- 4th Cavalry (59th State Troops)
- 5th Cavalry (63rd State Troops)
- 6th Cavalry (65th State Troops)
- 7th Cavalry (75th State Troops)
- 8th Cavalry (79th State Troops)
- 5th Battalion, Cavalry (see 6th Cavalry)
- 7th Battalion, Cavalry (see 6th Cavalry)
- 12th Battalion, Cavalry
- 14th Battalion, Cavalry
- 15th Battalion, Cavalry
- 16th Battalion, Cavalry

=== Partisan Rangers ===
- 4th Battalion, Partisan Rangers (see 7th Confederate Cavalry)
- 8th Battalion, Partisan Rangers (see 66th Infantry)
- 12th Battalion, Partisan Rangers
- Whitford's Battalion, Partisan Rangers

=== Artillery ===
- 1st Artillery (10th State Troops)
- 2nd Artillery (36th State Troops)
- 3rd Artillery (40th State Troops)

==== Light Artillery ====
- 3rd Battalion, Light Artillery
  - Edenton Bell Battery (Company B)
- 13th Battalion, Light Artillery

==== Heavy Artillery ====
- 1st Battalion, Heavy Artillery (9th Battalion)
- 2nd Battalion, Heavy Artillery (10th Battalion)
- 10th Battalion, Heavy Artillery

=== Legions ===
- Thomas' Legion
  - 69th Infantry Regiment
  - Walker's Cavalry Battalion
  - Cherokee Battalion
  - Levi's (Barr's) Battery, Light Artillery

== Local organizations ==
Throughout the course of the Civil War, various milita, home guard, and state troops units were under local North Carolina control. Some units were later mustered into Confederate service, but others remained at the call of the state.

=== Militia ===
The pre-war state militia was mobilized at the time of secession and took part in some actions from 1861-1862, but as time passed most men joined the Confederate army. The militia then mainly served as enforcers of the conscript law, until July 1863, when they were converted to become the Home Guards.

- 1st Militia
- 4th Militia
- 10th Militia
- 15th Militia
- 30th Militia
- 33rd Militia
- 39th Militia
- 40th Militia
- 41st Militia
- 42nd Militia
- 44th Militia
- 46th Militia
- 47th Militia
- 48th Militia
- 52nd Militia
- 57th Militia
- 60th Militia
- 62nd Militia
- 70th Militia
- 71st Militia
- 72nd Militia
- 73rd Militia
- 84th Militia
- 85th Militia
- 109th Militia
- Clark's Special Battalion, Militia

=== Home Guards ===
The Home Guards were authorized in July 1863, encompassing the former state militia and all men aged 18-50 who were otherwise exempt from Confederate conscription. Most counties furnished at least a battalion, and larger counties produced eight Home Guard regiments. The extension of the age range for conscription in February 1864 resulted in many of the Home Guards being diverted to the Senior Reserves, and the remaining Home Guard units were consolidated.

- 1st Home Guards
- 3rd (Hambrick's) Home Guards
- 3rd (Draughan's) Home Guards
- 4th Home Guards
- 5th Home Guards
- 6th Home Guards
- 7th Home Guards
- 8th Home Guards
- 1st Battalion, Home Guards
- 2nd Battalion, Home Guards
- 3rd Battalion, Home Guards
- 4th Battalion, Home Guards
- 7th Battalion, Home Guards
- 8th Battalion, Home Guards
- 10th Battalion, Home Guards
- 14th Battalion, Home Guards
- 18th Battalion, Home Guards
- 21st Battalion, Home Guards
- 22nd Battalion, Home Guards
- 23rd Battalion, Home Guards
- 24th Battalion, Home Guards
- 26th Battalion, Home Guards
- 27th Battalion, Home Guards
- 29th Battalion, Home Guards
- 37th Battalion, Home Guards
- 48th Battalion, Home Guards
- 59th Battalion, Home Guards
- 63rd Battalion, Home Guards
- 64th Battalion, Home Guards
- 68th Battalion, Home Guards
- 69th Battalion, Home Guards
- 72nd Battalion, Home Guards

=== State Troops ===
Prior to secession, the state legislature passed a law in May 1861 authorizing a state army of 10 regiments. These first ten regiments (8 infantry, 1 cavalry, 1 artillery) were transferred to Confederate service on June 27, 1861, and the infantry units kept their initial regimental numbers after becoming part of the national army.

- 1st Infantry, State Troops
- 2nd Infantry, State Troops
- 3rd Infantry, State Troops
- 4th Infantry, State Troops
- 5th Infantry, State Troops
- 6th Infantry, State Troops
- 7th Infantry, State Troops
- 8th Infantry, State Troops
- 9th State Troops, (see 1st Cavalry)
- 10th State Troops, (see 1st Artillery)

=== Junior Reserves ===
Following the passage of the February 17, 1864 Confederate conscription act, boys aged 17-18 were enlisted in the Junior Reserves. The initial seven battalions of junior reserves were later merged into three regiments.

- 1st Junior Reserves (70th State Troops Infantry)
- 2nd Junior Reserves (71st State Troops Infantry)
- 3rd Junior Reserves (72nd State Troops Infantry)
- 1st Battalion, Junior Reserves
- 2nd Battalion, Junior Reserves
- 4th Battalion, Junior Reserves
- 5th Battalion, Junior Reserves
- 7th Battalion, Junior Reserves
- 8th Battalion, Junior Reserves
- 9th Battalion (Millard's), Junior Reserves

=== Senior Reserves ===
Men aged 45-50 were enlisted in the Senior Reserves following the passage of the February 1864 conscription act.

- 4th Senior Reserves (73rd State Troops Infantry)
- 5th Senior Reserves (74th State Troops Infantry)
- 6th Senior Reserves (76th State Troops Infantry)
- 7th Senior Reserves (77th State Troops Infantry)
- 8th Senior Reserves (78th State Troops Infantry)
- 3rd Battalion, Senior Reserves
- Erwin's Battalion, Senior Reserves
- Hill's Battalion, Senior Reserves (22nd Battalion)
- Littlejohn's Battalion, Senior Reserves
- McCorkle's Battalion, Senior Reserves

=== Miscellaneous ===
- 1st Detailed Men (81st State Troops)
- 2nd Detailed Men (82nd State Troops)
- 3rd Detailed Men (83rd State Troops)
- 2nd Conscripts
- 2nd Battalion, Local Defense Troops
- 19th (Mallett's) Battalion (Camp Guard)
- Cumberland County Battalion, Detailed Men
- McLean's Battalion, Light Duty Men

== See also ==
- Lists of American Civil War Regiments by State
