= Lloyd R. Welch (Cherokee chief) =

Principal Chief of the Eastern Band of Cherokee Indians (1875–1880)

Principal Chief of the Eastern Band of Cherokee Indians
- In office 1875–1880
- Preceded by: Salonitah
- Succeeded by: Nimrod Jarrett Smith

Personal details
- Born: c. 1836 Cherokee County, North Carolina, U.S.
- Died: 1880 Cherokee County, North Carolina, U.S.
- Resting place: Welch-Blythe Cemetery, Marble, North Carolina

Lloyd Romulus Welch was the third Principal Chief of the Eastern Band of Cherokee Indians and is noted for the 1875 amendments to the Eastern Band Cherokee Constitution and the establishment of the Qualla Boundary.

Born around 1836, Welch married Mary Lee McKee, granddaughter of Gideon Morris, in 1860 and had three children (all died young). In 1868, while moving en route to the Cherokee Nation, Mary passed away. After a couple of years, Welch moved back to North Carolina and was a delegate from Cherokee County during the December 1, 1870 ratification of the Eastern Band Cherokee Constitution and first election of Principal Chief.

In 1875, Welch was elected Principal Chief. On October 13, 1875, new amendments to the Eastern Band Cherokee Constitution (also referred to as the Lloyd Welch Constitution) were approved. In 1876, the Qualla Boundary was established and surveyed by M.S. Temple under the auspices of the United States Land Office; on October 9, the conveyance of 50,000 acres (20,000 ha) occurred, followed by an additional 15,211 acres (6,156 ha) of outlying areas on August 14, 1880. The 47th United States Congress would later approve the conveyance of the Qualla Boundary.

Welch died in 1880 of pulmonary consumption at his residence in Cherokee County.

Political offices
Preceded by Salonitah	Principal Chief of the Eastern Band of Cherokee Indians; 1875–1880	Succeeded by Nimrod Jarrett Smith
