= 43rd North Carolina Infantry Regiment =

Infantry regiment of the Confederate States Army

- North Carolina State flag c. 1861
- Active: 1862 to April 9, 1865
- Country: Confederate States of America
- Allegiance: North Carolina
- Branch: Confederate States Army
- Type: Infantry
- Engagements: American Civil War Fort Johnson, Smithville, NC, NC (now Southport) Peninsular Campaign: Seven Days June 21- July 1, 1862: was positioned on the extreme right and saw little action; Engagement, Malvern Hill, Va August 5, 1862; Positioned at Drewey's Bluff, Va, during the Maryland Campaign; Positioned in Goldsboro, NC, from December 1862 through February 1863, then moved to Kinston, NC; Attempted recapture of New Bern and Washington, NC in March, but returned to Kinston, NC in April 1863 and back to Fredericksburg, Va, in May 1863; Pennsylvania Campaign: Brandy Station, and Beverly Ford, Va June 9, 1863; Winchester Action, June 13, 1863; Berryville, VA; Skirmish at Martinsburg, VA (now WV) June 14, 1863; Battle of Winchester, Va June 15, 1863; Gettysburg, Pa July 1–3, 1863; Skirmishes, Hagerstown, Md July 10–13, 1863; Bristoe Campaign October 9–22, 1863: Skirmish at Warrenton October 13, 1863; Operations Against the Advance of the Line of the Rappahannock November 7–8, 1863; Skirmish at Kelly's Ford, Va November 7, 1863; Attempted re-capture of New Bern, NC, January–May 1864; Battle of Drewey's Bluff, Va., May 16; Wilderness Campaign May 4- June 12, 1864: Spotsylvania Court House, Laurel Hill, Ny River, Fredericksburg Road May 8–21, 1864; Assault on the Salient, Spotsylvania Court House May 12, 1864; North Anna River, Va May 22–26, 1864; Jericho Bridge, Va May 25, 1864; Pamunkey River, Va May 26, 1864; Totopotomoy River, Va May 28–31, 1864; Bethesda Church, Va May 31- June 1, 1864; Cold Harbor June 1–12, 1864; 1864 Shenandoah Valley Campaign: Lynchburg, VA, June 17–18, 1864; Buford's Gap, June 29; Harper's Ferry, July 4–5; Maryland heights, July 6; Monocacy July 9, 1864; Skirmish at Fort Stevens, DC July 11–12, 1864; Snicker's Gap (Parker's Ford) July 18, 1864; Kernstown, Va July 24, 1864; Winchester, Va August 17, 1864; Skirmish near Charlestown, WV August 21–22, 1864; Berryville, Va September 4, 1864; Abraham's Creek, Va September 13, 1864; Skirmish near Berryville, Va September 14, 1864; Sevier's Ford, Opequan Creek, Va September 15, 1864; Third Winchester September 19, 1864; Fisher's Hill September 22, 1864; Port Republic, Va September 26–28, 1864; Cedar Creek October 19, 1864; Rude's Hill, near Mount Jackson, Va November 23, 1864; Removal to Richmond and Petersburg, December 1864; Petersburg Campaign: Dabney's Mills, Rowanty Creek, Va February 5–7, 1865; Fort Stedman March 25, 1865; Fort Mahone April 2, 1865; The Retreat: Rennes Salient, April 5, 1865; Sayler's Creek April 6, 1865; Farmville/High Bridge April 7, 1865; Assault at Appomattox Court House April 9, 1865; Surrender at Appomattox Court House April 9, 1865

The 43rd North Carolina Infantry Regiment, also known as the 43rd Regiment, North Carolina State Troops or 43rd N.C.S.T., was organized at Camp Mangum, about four miles west of Raleigh, North Carolina, on March 18, 1862.

== Officers ==
Junius Daniel was elected colonel of this regiment in March 1862, but declined the appointment. He was later elected colonel of the 45th North Carolina Infantry. Thomas S. Kenan was elected Lieutenant colonel of the 43rd regiment in March 1862, and promoted to colonel in April 1862. Wounded in action on July 3, 1863, at Gettysburg, PA, he was later captured during the retreat. Confined at Johnson's Island, Ohio, until exchanged on March 22, 1865. Photo at Alabama Department of Archives and History. Hampton Beverly served as acting commander of the 43rd Regiment from January–February 1863. William Gaston Lewis transferred as Lieutenant colonel from the 33rd North Carolina Infantry on April 25, 1862, and appointed acting commander on July 3, 1863. He was promoted to Brigadier General on May 31, 1864.

== History ==
43rd Regiment, North Carolina Infantry: 43rd Infantry Regiment was assembled at Camp Mangum, near Raleigh, North Carolina, in March, 1862. Its members were from counties in Mecklenburg, Wilson, Halifax, Edgecombe, Warren, Union, and Anson . During the war the 43rd was assigned to General Junius Daniel's, Robert F. Hoke's, and Bryan Grimes' Brigade. It fought in the Seven Days' Battles and saw action at Goldsboro, Gettysburg, Plymouth, Drewry's Bluff, and Cold Harbor. The regiment was then involved in Early's Shenandoah Valley operations and the Appomattox Campaign. It was organized with 1,066 officers and men, lost twenty-six percent of the 572 engaged at Gettysburg, and had 4 killed and 13 wounded at Plymouth. On April 9, 1865, it surrendered 9 officers and 164 men.

== Malvern Hill ==
In the Battle of Malvern Hill the 43rd was ordered to occupy a road near the James River, where it was exposed to galling fire from the Federal gunboats, and from the Union artillery batteries on Malvern Hill in front. However, the regiment was not actively engaged.

The 43rd remained at Drewry's Bluff protecting Richmond during the Sharpsburg Campaign, and was later sent to Kinston, NC in the spring of 1863 in order to help relieve Washington, NC from the federal occupation.

== Gettysburg ==
From the public monument at Gettysburg: Forty-third North Carolina Regiment, Daniel's Brigade Rodes's Division, Ewell's Corps, Army of Northern Virginia. Thomas Stephen Kenan, Colonel; William Gaston Lewis, Lieutenant Colonel; Walter Jones Boggan, Major. As they approached the field of battle on the morning of July 1, the 43rd North Carolina, along with the rest of Daniel's Brigade, heard the distant booming of cannon. Early in the afternoon the regiment moved to the right and onto open ground where they were met by a furious fire. Their steady progress was checked by the deep railroad cut, but subsequent assaults were successful in breaking the Union line. Having suffered heavily, the regiment rested for the night west of town. The next morning the 43rd supported a battery just north of the Seminary. Shelling from guns on the nearby heights inflicted some losses. Toward evening the Regiment took up a position on the southern edge of town. Before daybreak on July 3, the 43d moved to the extreme left of the Confederate line to take part in an assault on Culp's Hill. Passing this point and advancing under heavy fire, they occupied earthworks abandoned by Union troops. Attempting to push beyond the works, the regiment was exposed to a most severe fire of canister, shrapnel and shell at short range. During the attack Col. Kenan was wounded and taken from the field and command passed to Lt. Col. Lewis. The Regiment retired to this point and remained exposed and under fire until ordered to recross Rock Creek in the early evening. "All that men could do, was done nobly"

== Plymouth, NC ==
In the spring of 1864, the 43rd Infantry took part in the Battle of Plymouth (1864), where the regiment helped take the town, with the Union garrison and a great deal of supplies were captured. The command was given "The Thanks of the Confederate Congress" for their success. The regiment then aided in the attacks on New Bern, NC and Washington, NC. They returned to Virginia in May 1864.

== Snicker's Gap ==
The 43rd North Carolina Infantry was part of the Valley Campaigns of 1864, which included Battle of Cool Spring or Snicker's Gap. As Jubal Early's Confederate troops were leaving the area around Washington, DC, pursuing Federal forces caused a battle in a small gap in the Blue Ridge mountains. "The troops then moved toward the Valley of Virginia, and crossed the Blue Ridge at Snicker's Gap on 17 July, the Union troops slowly following and an additional force threatening the flank of the Confederate right. On the afternoon of that day Rodes's Division attacked the enemy at Snicker's Gap, driving them into the Shenandoah River, where the loss in killed and drowned was very heavy."

Another soldier recorded the costs of the battle in his diary: "We succeeded in driving the enemy back across the river and to that instant the victory remained with us but I doubt whether we won an advantage by the fight. Our casualties were quite heavy as heavy probably as that of the enemy. From the best information I can gather we had about three and the Yankees about seven thousand men engaged. In this Engagement my Regiment counted three hundred and twenty-nine muskets. My flag received six bullet holes in it. The color bearer was wounded through the arm..."

== Appomattox Courthouse ==
The 43rd Regiment, North Carolina State Troops, participated in the Battle of Appomattox Court House, and surrendered on April 9, 1865, with 9 officers and 164 men. General Bryan Grimes' Division was composed of four brigades, and on April 10, 1865, there were present for duty 1,659 officers and men, with 722 .58 calibre muskets among the men, 11 more muskets in the brigade trains, and 30 more muskets in the division trains. There were thus twenty regiments with 722 muskets in their hands, an average of 36 muskets to each regiment and less than four to each company, with 32 rounds of ammunition for each musket with the troops, and forty in the brigade ordnance wagons and another fifteen rounds per musket in the division trains, a total of about 87 rounds per musket, enough to put up a pretty stiff fight. 722 muskets among 1,659 men represents the fighting strength of Grimes’ division at Appomattox Court House at the time of the surrender.

== Commendations ==
In the after-action report following the battle of Gettysburg, the regimental commander wrote: "With but one exception–and that an officer–the officers and men behaved remarkably well. There was no straggling from this regiment. Where all acted so well, it is difficult to particularize for good conduct; but Lieutenant [Jesse A.] Macon, Company F, and Lieutenant [W. E.] Stitt, Company B, showed such marked coolness and bravery on the field, that it is just that they should be mentioned. Sergeants [P. B.] Grier, Company B, and [G. W.] Wills, Company D, behaved remarkably well."

Following the Battle of Plymouth (1864), the government "Resolved by Congress of the Confederate States of America, that the thanks of Congress and the country are due and are tendered to Major-General Robert F. Hoke and Commander James W. Cooke, and the officers and men under their command, for the brilliant victory over the enemy at Plymouth, NC. Joint Resolution Approved May 17, 1864."

== Regimental Organization ==
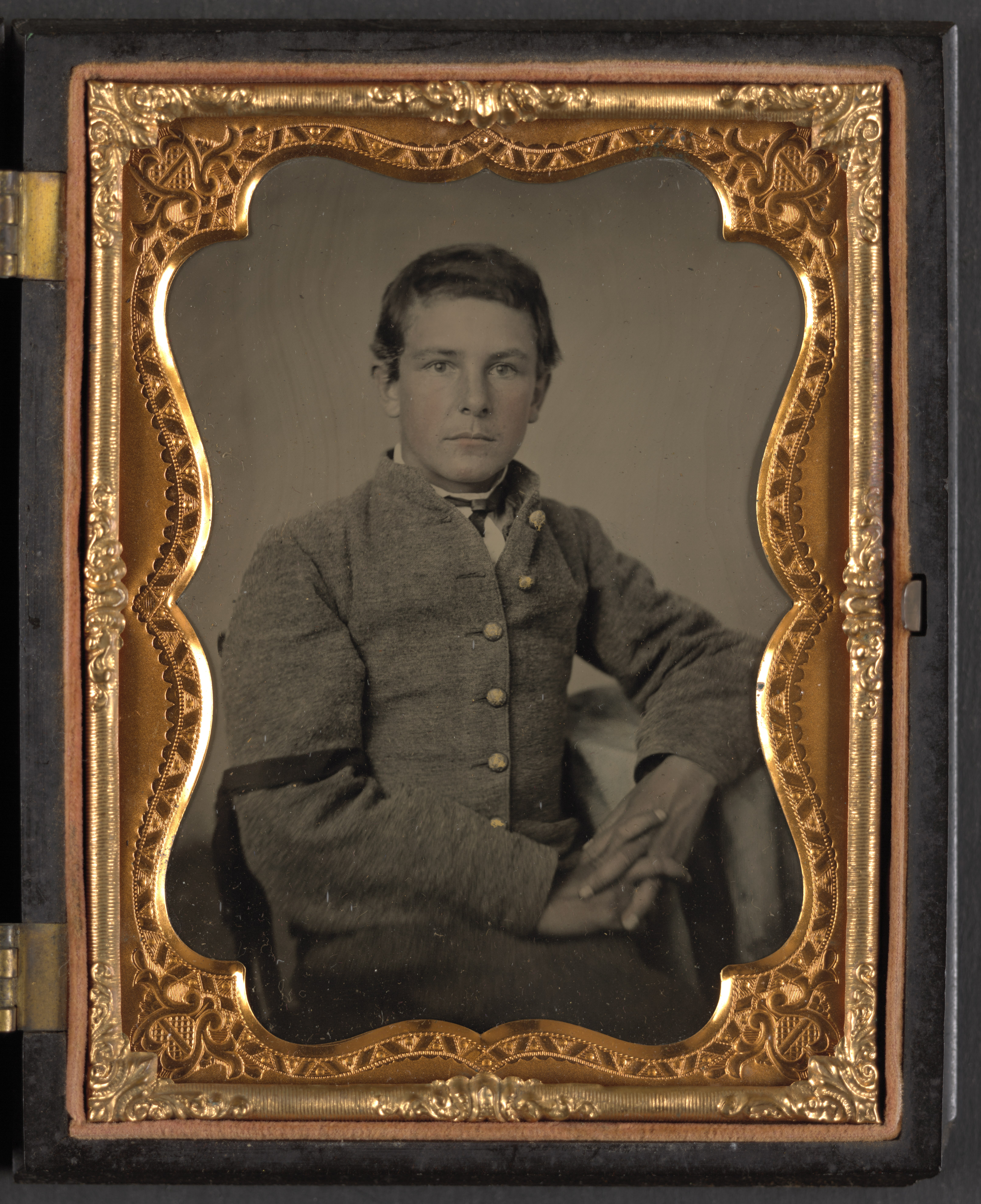
Private Thomas P. Devereux of Co. D, 43rd North Carolina Infantry Regiment

Many of the companies in North Carolina military units were from the same county or area, but not all men in these companies are from those counties. Many were recent immigrants, married into local families, purchased land or had occupations that would take them from another place into North Carolina.

Company A - "The Duplin Rifles" - many men from Duplin County, NC. The company entered service in April, 1861, as Company C of the 2nd North Carolina Volunteers, stationed near Norfolk, Va. At the end of their six months service, they were transferred to Company A, 43rd NC. 117 enlisted men. "From a roster kept by Sergeant B.F. Hall, it appears that there were fifty-six men on the rolls at the close of the war, thirty-five who were either in prison, on parole or detail, and no deserter from the company during the entire war."

Company B - "Union Farmers" - many men from Mecklenburg County, NC. 73 enlisted men.

Company C - many men from Wilson County, NC. 102 enlisted men.

Company D - many men from Halifax County, NC. 93 enlisted men.

Company E - "Edgecombe Boys" - many men from Edgecombe County, NC. 96 enlisted men.

Company F - many men from Halifax County, NC. 101 enlisted men.

Company G - "Warren Defenders" - many men from Warren County, NC. 110 enlisted men.

Company H - "Fisher's Light Infantry" - many men from Anson County, NC. 112 enlisted men.

Company I - "Anson Regulators" - many men from Anson County. 139 enlisted men.

Company K - "Anson Independent" - meny men from Anson County. 120 enlisted men.

== See also ==
- List of North Carolina Confederate Civil War units

== Bibliography ==
- Barnes, Ruffin, and Hugh Buckner Johnston. The Confederate Letters of Ruffin Barnes of Wilson County, North Carolina. Wilson, N.C.: [s.n.], 1953. Original letters are "now in the possession of the Hon. W.A. Lucas, of Wilson, North Carolina"—Leaf [1]. Typescript (carbon copy)--with corrections written in. Includes the text of 21 letters written by Capt. Ruffin Barnes of Company C, 43rd North Carolina Infantry Regiment, plus one letter to him written by Jesse Watson.
- Barnes, Ruffin. Ruffin Barnes Civil War Letters. 1862. Three original letters and six transcriptions of letters from Ruffin Barnes, a Confederate soldier in the 43rd North Carolina Infantry. Barnes writes to his wife Mary A. Barnes and discusses generally his homesickness, his plans to visit her, his diet, and his daily activities. In a 17 October 1862 letter, he mentions buying an expensive dress for her. He writes, "there is plenty of this Confederate money and it may be no count if I was to lay it all up." In a 26 October 1863 letter he discusses eating beef for nearly every meal and his longing for milk or vegetables. In an 18 July 1864 letter addressed from Harpers Ferry, Barnes discusses marching to Sharpsburg, skirmishing with the 6th Yankee corps, and marching on "Washington city." In addition, Barnes writes that the unit had marched some 3,000 miles and that "our brigade is not as large now as it once was." He notes a decision not to attack Washington because "finding them so well fortified our Genl. commanding . . . thought he would make too grate [sic] a sacrifice of life to undertake to enter the town." In passing, Barnes also writes, "tell father that Bennett has got old Francis P. Blair's sword. He is United States Postmaster and a Black hearted notorious abolitionist."
- Beavans, William. William Beavans Diary and Letters. 1861. William Beavans's diary, January 1861-July 1864, which includes intermittent entries written at home in Halifax County, N.C., and during the Civil War while campaigning in Virginia with the 1st North Carolina Infantry Regiment in 1861, and with the 43rd North Carolina Infantry Regiment, 1862-1864. The diary documents weather, reading, drilling, troop movements, and other matters, and includes drafts of love letters and poems; remarks about the women Beavans courted; and memoranda regarding ordnance, mess accounts, and finances. Also included are a letter to Maggie Beavans, Beavans's sister, commenting on the conscript law, measles, and camp life, and two letters of Maggie and her friend Fannie regarding friends, relatives, and sweethearts killed in the war.
- Birdsong, James Cook, 1843- ? Brief Sketches of the North Carolina State Troops in the War Between the States, includes the First, Second, Third, Fourth... Collected and Compiled by James C. Birdsong, State Librarian, under a Resolution Ratified March 6, 1893.. Raleigh, NC: Josephus Daniels, State Printer and Binder. 1894. 213 pages.
- Carr, W. D., Robert Aycock, and Elsie J. Aycock. The Civil War Letters of W.D. Carr of Duplin County, North Carolina: With Additional Notes on His Family and the Campaigns in Which He Served. Raleigh, N.C. (2001 Manuel St., Raleigh): R. and E.J. Aycock, 1995.
- Dabbs, J. J. Sketch of the Anson Regulators Compiled from Muster Roll and Other Memoranda. S.l: s.n, 1800.
- Hall, Benjamin F. Sketch of the Duplin Rifles. Raleigh? N.C.: s.n, 1895. 'Duplin Rifles' existed as the 2nd Regiment, Co. C during 1861 and reorganized as the 43rd Regiment, Co. A for 1862-1865. "Prepared from muster-roll and memoranda by Sergeant B.F. Hall"—P. 2.
- Kenan family. Kenan Family Papers. 1748. Correspondence among various members of the Kenan and Graham families, relating to activities of relatives in North Carolina, Alabama, Maryland, and other southern states. Letters document the political, domestic, and economic interests of well-to-do Southerners between 1810 and 1900. In their letters, the Kenans and Grahams discussed contemporary concerns, such as slavery and plantation life; the activities of Confederate congressman Owen Rand Kenan (1804-1887); educational opportunities for young men and women; religion; agricultural problems in the old and new South; turn-of-the-century experiences of young scholars and other members of the Kenan family; and the role of William R. Kenan, Jr. (1872-1965), in publicizing the discovery of calcium carbide. In addition to the letters, there are financial and legal papers that pertain to the political, business, and military activities of various Kenans and Grahams. Also included are account books, bills and receipts, printed material, and miscellaneous papers illustrating the wide-ranging interests of members of these two families: Thomas S. Kenan's Civil War service in the 43rd N.C. Regiment; medicine; the University of North Carolina, especially in the 1890s; women's work; the Democratic Party; and the restoration of Liberty Hall, the Kenan homestead in Kenansville, Duplin County, N.C. Also included are a few recipe books; a brief travel diary from trips to Canada in 1895 and 1897; and photographs of various family members and their acquaintances, including Graham Kenan (1883-1920) and friends during their undergraduate days at the University of North Carolina, ca. 1904. Union Carbide materials include two letterpress books documenting the early history of the Union Carbide Company and its predecessor companies and Union Carbide Corporation: A Brief Look at Historical Highlights (1991) by M.A. Hill, which traces the formation of the company and the growth of chemicals and plastics production and technical facilities in the United States. The Addition of 2007 contains correspondence, notes, and clippings, 1806-1947, pertaining to the Kenan family, chiefly to Chauncey Graham and Stephen Graham, and to Mary Lilly Kenan Flagler Bingham. The Addition of February 2008 includes a likeness of James Kenan (1740-1810).
- Kenan, Thomas S. Additional Sketch Forty-Third Regiment, Company A.
- Kenan, Thomas S. [.oclc.org/cdm/ref/collection/p15012coll8/id/34 Sketch of the Forty-third Regiment North Carolina troops. Prepared in 1895 by officers and men who were participants in its movements.] Regimental history including a roster of the forty-third regiment North Carolina troops. Includes details of the Three-Days Fight, the Battle of Plymouth, and the Battle of Drewry's Bluff. General Collection. State Library of North Carolina.
- Kenan, Thomas S. "Forty-Third Regiment." North Carolina Troops, 861-1865. Pages 1–20.
- Kenan, Thomas S. "Prisoners at Johnson Island to Governor Vance." North Carolina Troops, 861-1865. Pages 697-701.
- Manarin, Louis H., and Weymouth T. Jordan. "43rd Regiment NC Troops." North Carolina Troops 1861-1865 A Roster. Vol. 10. Raleigh, N.C.: State Dept. of Archives and History, 1966. Pages 289-293.
- Parker, Lizzie Nelms Smith. Papers. 1854. Personal and family correspondence of Lizzie [Nelms?] (Smith) Parker consisting chiefly of letters from her brother, William T. Smith, concerning his activities as a Confederate soldier, teacher at the Carolina Female College and the Anson Institute, and as a farmer in Anson County, N.C. Civil War letters discuss high prices; Union sentiment in Wilmington, N.C.; the siege of Petersburg; and the activities of the 43rd Regiment, North Carolina Troops, C.S.A. Other letters describe Reconstruction in Wilmington, N.C., and emphasize the advantages of living in Texas.
- Polk, Leonidas L. 1876. The 43rd NC Regiment During the War: "Whiffs from My Old Camp Pipe" by Leonidas L. Polk of the Weekly Ansonian (Polkton, NC).
- Turner, John M. Correspondence. 1862. Correspondence between Turner and his wife, Moley, while he was near Raleigh, N.C., with the 43rd North Carolina Infantry Regiment, Company A, primarily describing camp life, life on the farm in Duplin County, and their affection for each other.
- Whitaker, Cary. Cary Whitaker Papers. 1798. The collection consists of a diary, 1864, written while Whitaker was captain of Company D, 43rd North Carolina Infantry Regiment, serving in Virginia, recounting camp life, battles, and hospital experience; Whitaker's notebook containing model statements for indictments or convictions for crimes, most involving slaves or free blacks, 1859; an inventory of property of J.S. and Cary Whitaker, 1865, and other entries; Civil War documents, 1862-1865; and scattered Whitaker family papers, including a few family and business letters from Halifax County, N.C., 1798-1980.
- Wills, George Whitaker. George Whitaker Wills Letters. 1861. Civil War letters from Wills, a soldier with the 43rd N.C. Infantry Regiment in Virginia, to his sister in Halifax County, N.C., concerning camp life and troop movements, including moving through Pennsylvania toward Gettysburg, and other military affairs.
- Wills, William H. William Henry Wills Papers, 1712-1892, Halifax and Washington Counties, North Carolina Also Florida, Georgia, and Maryland. Bethesda, MD: University Publications of America, 1992. This collection documents the life of itinerant ministers of the Methodist Protestant Church and church administration between the 1840s-1890s, with information on circuit travel, camp meetings, finances, arbitrations and trials, race relations within the church, and local, state, district, and national administration. Other topics include marriage and family life; boarding school life; plantation affairs; general merchants; slavery; politics; Civil War camp life; and women teachers in the postbellum period. There are letters from students at Chowan Female Institute, Warrenton Female College, Baltimore Female College, and the University of North Carolina; from teachers in several locations, including the Oxford Orphan Asylum. Civil War letters are from soldiers in the 2nd, 17th, and 43rd North Carolina regiments, and from a slave who travelled with the 2nd and 43rd regiments. Religious papers include reports, trial documents, sermons, essays (most written by a woman), circuit class books, and marriage licenses. Plantation papers include correspondence and legal and financial materials relating to cotton planters in eastern North Carolina and Florida. There are also a few travel diaries documenting journeys in the antebellum South, and a diary commenting on life in Key West, Miami, and Tampa, Fla. William H. Wills was a general merchant, an itinerant Methodist Protestant minister, and a cotton planter in Halifax County, N.C. His wife was Anna Whitaker Wills (1817-1893), and his children included Reverend Richard H. (1836-1891), George Whitaker (1842-1864), Mary (1848-1941), Lucy (b. 1844), and Edward (b. 1846). Other prominent Wills family members were Dr. Cary Whitaker (1782-1858) of Enfield, N.C., and Jackson County, Fla.
- Wellman, Manly Wade. Rebel Boast: First at Bethel—Last at Appomattox. New York: H. Holt, 1956. Whitaker family.
