= Thomas' Legion =

Infantry regiment of the Confederate States Army

Thomas' Legion of Indians and Highlanders 69th North Carolina Infantry Regiment
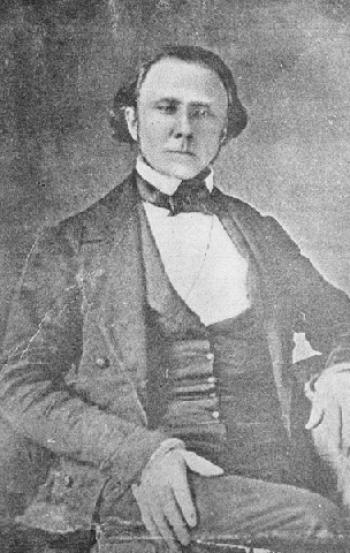
- Col. William H. Thomas
- Active: September 27, 1862 – May 10, 1865
- Allegiance: Confederate States of America
- Branch: Confederate States Army
- Type: Legion / Regiment
- Role: Combined arms formation / Infantry
- Size: 1,125 men (initial strength)
- Engagements: American Civil War

Commanders
- Notable commanders: Col. William Holland Thomas

Thomas' Legion, also known as Thomas' Legion of Cherokee Indians and Highlanders, Thomas' Legion of Indians and Highlanders, and the 69th North Carolina Regiment, was a unit of the Confederate Army in the American Civil War. The formation was organized in 1862 by William Holland Thomas and fought in the last skirmish of the war in North Carolina before surrendering in May 1865.

The regiment was unusual in several respects. Thomas, an adopted Cherokee and agent for the Eastern Cherokees, recruited a sizable number of Cherokees. In addition, like a few other Civil War formations, it was a true legion, that is a combined arms unit, consisting of infantry, cavalry, and artillery.

William Holland Thomas actively promoted the idea of having Cherokees fight for the Confederacy. In 1862, he organized 200 Cherokee Indians in North Carolina as the Junaluska Zouaves, named after Chief Junaluska; by April, he had raised the North Carolina Cherokee Battalion. His petition to recruit additional Cherokees and whites was approved by Confederate authorities and he was authorized to raise a legion.

It was officially organized on September 27, 1862, at Knoxville, Tennessee, with recruits coming primarily from western North Carolina and eastern Tennessee. The unit, under the command of newly elected Colonel William Holland Thomas, initially comprised 1125 men in an infantry regiment and a cavalry battalion. The infantry was organized into ten companies, two Cherokee (Companies A and B) and eight white (C-I, K), and became known as Love's Regiment, under Lieutenant Colonel James R. Love II. Walker's Battalion was raised in Cherokee County, North Carolina by William Stringfield and led by Lieutenant Colonel William C. Walker. The third element was the Cherokee Battalion, made up of 400 Cherokees. John T. Levi's Light Artillery Battery was added on April 1, 1863.

The unit was mainly assigned to defend the area. A portion of the Legion was sent to Powell's Valley in late 1862 and was ambushed at Baptist Gap. When Cherokee Lieutenant Astooga Stoga was killed leading a counterattack, enraged Indian comrades scalped several dead or wounded Union soldiers. To defuse the situation, Colonel Thomas had the scalps returned to the Union with apologies.

The Legion was sent east to join General Jubal Early in the Valley Campaigns of 1864 in the Shenandoah Valley of Virginia. At this point, the Legion was down to 500 men. It fought in the Battle of Cedar Creek on October 19, 1864. By the time the Legion was transferred back to North Carolina, it mustered fewer than 100 soldiers. An appreciative General Gabriel C. Wharton stated, "The gallant conduct of your command rendered your efforts to rejoin your command in North Carolina abortive, and the constant refusal to your many applications for transfer is complimentary evidence of the esteem in which you were held, and a grateful acknowledgement of the services you could render."

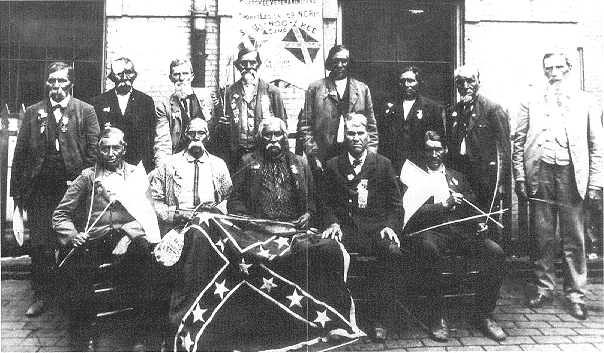
Cherokee confederates (Thomas' Legion) at the U.C.V reunion in New Orleans, 1903.

Back in his home state, Thomas brought the unit's strength up to 1200 men, including 400 Cherokees, by April 1, 1865. Eight days later, however, Robert E. Lee surrendered his army to Ulysses S. Grant. Thomas and his Legion surrendered to Union forces at Waynesville, North Carolina, on May 10.

== See also ==
- List of North Carolina Confederate Civil War units
- List of American Civil War legions

== Bibliography ==
- Volume XVI of North Carolina Troops 1861–1865 A Roster: Thomas's Legion (2008), Matthew M. Brown and Michael W. Coffey (editors).
