= Junius Daniel =

Confederate States Army general

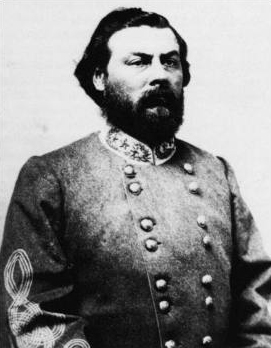
- Born: June 27, 1828; Halifax, North Carolina, U.S.
- Died: May 13, 1864 (aged 35); Spotsylvania County, Virginia, C.S.
- Military career
- Allegiance: United States; Confederate States
- Branch: United States Army; Confederate States Army
- Service years: 1851–1858 (USA); 1861–1864 (CSA)
- Rank: First Lieutenant (USA); Brigadier General (CSA)
- Conflicts: American Civil War: Battle of Gettysburg; Battle of Spotsylvania Court House †

Junius Daniel (June 27, 1828 – May 13, 1864) was an American planter and military officer who served in the United States Army, then in the Confederate States Army during the American Civil War as a brigadier general. His troops were instrumental in the Confederates' success at the first day of the Battle of Gettysburg. He was killed in action at the Battle of Spotsylvania Court House.

== Early life ==
Daniel was born in Halifax, North Carolina, to a wealthy political family. His father, John Reeves Jones Daniel, served as an attorney general of North Carolina and member of the United States Congress. His mother, Martha Stith, came from a prominent family of early Virginians that descended from John Stith and William Randolph. Daniel was educated at an elementary school in Halifax and at the J. M. Lovejoy Academy in Raleigh. President James K. Polk appointed him to the United States Military Academy in 1846. He graduated 33rd out of 42 in the Class of 1851. Appointed a brevet second lieutenant in the 3rd U.S. Infantry, Daniel was sent to Newport, Kentucky as assistant quartermaster. In 1852, he was assigned to Fort Albuquerque in the New Mexico Territory, remaining stationed at the frontier outpost for five years. Temporarily under the command of Richard S. Ewell of the 3rd Dragoons, Lieutenant Daniel saw action in a series of skirmishes with the Apache Indians in 1855. In 1858, Daniel resigned his commission to begin a career as a planter in Louisiana, joining his father who had moved there following his last term in Congress in 1851. In October 1860, Daniel married Ellen Long, daughter of Col. John J. Long of Northampton County, North Carolina. They had no children.

== American Civil War ==
Though offered a commission by Louisiana after President Abraham Lincoln's call for volunteer troops in April 1861, Daniel returned to Halifax and instead offered his services to his native state. He was chosen colonel of the 4th (later 14th) Regiment of infantry. When the period of enlistment expired, he was offered several positions, commanding the 43rd North Carolina Infantry or 45th North Carolina Infantry as well as the 2nd North Carolina Cavalry. He accepted the command of the 45th Regiment as its colonel.

Daniel led four regiments from Raleigh to Goldsboro and organized them into a brigade; afterward, he organized two other brigades. In June 1862, he was ordered to Petersburg, Virginia, where his brigade joined General Robert E. Lee's Army of Northern Virginia just before the Seven Days Battles, though it took no active part in the combat. Daniel was commissioned brigadier general on September 1, 1862, making him one of five men from Halifax County to attain that rank in the Confederate Army. He spent the fall of 1862 with his brigade at Drewy's Bluff in Virginia and subsequently served in North Carolina, although his unit saw limited combat action.

Shortly after the Battle of Chancellorsville, he was transferred to Maj. Gen. Robert E. Rodes's division of Richard S. Ewell's Second Corps, where he served with distinction in the Gettysburg campaign. Daniel's large brigade, entrusted to bear the Corps Flag, consisted of the 32nd, 43rd, 45th and 53rd North Carolina, as well as the 2nd North Carolina Battalion. On July 1, 1863, Daniel's Brigade repeatedly attacked the Union positions on McPherson's Ridge, eventually driving off the Union brigade of Col. Roy Stone. Initially, after his brigade's first assault was repulsed, Daniel heroically galloped about his retreating men, successfully rallying them and launching another assault. Daniel's men suffered the greatest losses of any brigade in the corps on the first day of the battle.

During the Battle of Spotsylvania Court House on May 12, 1864, Daniel led his brigade in a fierce counterattack on the "Mule Shoe" (also known as the "Bloody Angle"), trying to recapture the important position from elements of the Army of the Potomac, which had captured it at dawn. He was struck in the abdomen by a Minié ball, inflicting a mortal wound. He died the next day in a field hospital. His body was taken to Halifax and buried in the old colonial cemetery. Unknown to Daniel, Robert E. Lee had recommended his promotion to major general just prior to his death.

== Legacy ==
Fellow North Carolina general and close personal friend Bryan Grimes later wrote, "He was decidedly the best general officer from our state. Though in all probability I gained a brigadier at his death, I would for the sake of the country always remained in the status quo than the country should have lost his services." General Grimes named one of his sons Junius Daniel Grimes (who would become a well-known Washington, D.C., attorney in the late 19th century).

== Honors ==
The Junius Daniel Chapter of the United Daughters of the Confederacy of Weldon, North Carolina, was named in his honor.

== See also ==
- List of American Civil War generals (Confederate)
