= Edenton Bell Battery =

Edenton Bell Battery refers to an artillery unit from North Carolina that served for the Confederate States of America in the American Civil War, the four named guns the unit served throughout the war, and to an American Civil War reenactment group based in Edenton, North Carolina inspired by the original unit.

== Military formation ==
The Edenton Bell Battery, 3rd Battalion North Carolina Light Artillery Company B, were originally recruited in March 1862 as the Albemarle Artillery by Edenton lawyer William Badham, Jr., as most of the men were from North Carolina's Albemarle Sound area. Drilled as artillery at Richmond, Virginia in April and May, 1862, the unit found themselves in danger of being designated an infantry company, because of the scarcity of cannon available to outfit battery companies. A captain was dispatched back to Edenton for help.

Early in the war, Confederate leader P. G. T. Beauregard, recognizing the immediate need for large metal sources for artillery pieces, suggested one expedient would be for local communities to donate bells from churches, courthouses, and other institutions. A song, "Melt the Bells," widely reprinted in southern presses, inspired many in Chowan and surrounding counties to donate bells for recasting. After four bells from the Edenton, North Carolina area were offered, the Albemarle Artillery was renamed the Edenton Bell Battery.

The Tredegar Iron Works in Richmond, Virginia melted down the bells and recast them into four bronze cannon. The company voted to name the resulting cannon to honor each bell's donation. The Edenton, cast from the bell of the 1731 Edenton courthouse, fired six pound shot, as did the Columbia, named for the capital of nearby Tyrrell County, Columbia. The twelve-pounder St. Paul was named for the St. Paul's Episcopal Church in Edenton which donated its bell for the purpose. Fannie Roulac was another twelve-pound weapon, created from the bell once atop the Edenton United Methodist Church, where Miss Roulac was highly regarded and a church leader.

The battery served in Virginia with the Army of Northern Virginia at the Seven Days Battles and Battle of Fredericksburg. In 1863 the battery was sent to North Carolina and fought in the Battle of Kinston. On January 15, 1865, after the fall of Fort Fisher the battery engaged in a fighting retreat towards Wilmington, North Carolina. While retreating, the St. Paul and Edenton and their gun crews were captured in the Battle of Town Creek after inflicting heavy casualties on Union forces. The remaining battery fought in the Battle of Bentonville. The Edenton was surrendered with the surviving men of the battery and Army of Tennessee under General Johnston on April 26, 1865. The Fannie Roulac and Columbia were rumored to have been dumped into the Eno River during the unit's retreat with Confederate forces west of Raleigh after the Battle of Bentonville.

The post-war fate of the four cannon was shrouded in mystery until 1990, when an Edenton Civil War re-enactor discovered the Edenton on display at Shiloh National Military Park in Shiloh, Tennessee. When contacted, the National Park Service (NPS) stated the Edenton could be returned to its hometown only as part of a trade for a similar early Civil War Confederate cannon tube. However, in 1999, the NPS helped put the Edenton Historical Commission in contact with Fort Niagara in Youngstown, New York, where the St. Paul was located in storage. In 2001 the Old Fort Niagara Association loaned the St. Paul to the commission. From 2006 to 2012, while an accurate reproduction of the gun was being secured, Shiloh National Military Park loaned the original Edenton for display next to the St. Paul in Edenton's waterfront park. [The Edenton returned to Shiloh NMP in time for the battle's sesquicentennial. Today the Edenton is one of several original Confederate cannon marking the location of Ruggles' Line on Shiloh Battlefield.]

== See also ==
- List of North Carolina Confederate Civil War units
