= Alfred Iverson Jr. =

Confederate Army officer in the American Civil War

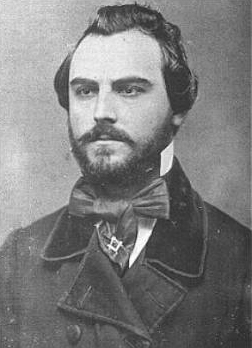
- Born: February 14, 1829; Clinton, Georgia
- Died: March 31, 1911 (aged 82); Atlanta, Georgia
- Burial place: Oakland Cemetery Atlanta, Georgia
- Military career
- Allegiance: United States; Confederate States of America
- Branch: United States Army; Confederate States Army
- Service years: 1846–48, 1855–61 (USA); 1861–65 (CSA)
- Rank: First Lieutenant (USA); Brigadier General (CSA)
- Commands: 20th North Carolina Infantry; Iverson's Brigade; Iverson's Cavalry Brigade
- Conflicts: Mexican–American War American Civil War: Seven Days Battles Battle of Gaines's Mill; Battle of South Mountain; Battle of Antietam; Battle of Chancellorsville; Battle of Gettysburg; Atlanta campaign; Carolinas campaign

Alfred Iverson Jr. (February 14, 1829 – March 31, 1911) was a lawyer, an officer in the Mexican–American War, a U.S. Army cavalry officer, and a Confederate general in the American Civil War. He served in the 1862–63 campaigns of the Army of Northern Virginia as a regimental and later brigade commander. His career was fatally damaged by a disastrous infantry assault at the first day of the Battle of Gettysburg. General Robert E. Lee removed Iverson from his army and sent him to cavalry duty in Georgia. During the Atlanta campaign, he achieved a notable success in a cavalry action near Macon, Georgia, capturing Union Army Maj. Gen. George Stoneman and hundreds of his men.

== Early years ==
Iverson was born in Clinton, Jones County, Georgia. He was the son of Alfred Iverson Sr., United States Senator for Georgia and a fierce proponent of secession, and Caroline Goode Holt. The senator decided on a military career for his son and enrolled him in the Tuskegee Military Institute. He also studied at the Episcopal High School in Alexandria, Virginia.

Iverson's career as a soldier began at the age of 17, when the Mexican–American War began. His father raised and equipped a regiment of Georgia volunteers and young Iverson left Tuskegee to become a second lieutenant in the regiment. He left the service, in July 1848, to become a lawyer and contractor. In 1855, his Mexican–American War experience gained him a commission as a first lieutenant in the 1st U.S. Cavalry regiment. In that role he served in efforts to suppress the violence known as Bleeding Kansas.

== Civil War ==
=== Early assignments ===
At the start of the Civil War, Iverson resigned from the U.S. Army and received a commission from his father's old friend, Confederate President Jefferson Davis, as colonel of the 20th North Carolina Infantry, a unit he played a strong role in recruiting. His regiment was initially stationed in North Carolina, but was called to the Virginia Peninsula in June 1862, for the Seven Days Battles. He distinguished himself at the Battle of Gaines's Mill, in the division commanded by Maj. Gen. D.H. Hill, by leading the only successful regiment of the five that were assigned to capture a Union artillery battery. Iverson was severely wounded in the charge and his regiment took heavy casualties. Unfortunately for Iverson and the Confederacy, this battle would turn out to be the high point of his military career.

Iverson recovered in time to rejoin the Army of Northern Virginia in the Maryland Campaign. In the Battle of South Mountain, his entire brigade was forced to retreat after their brigade commander, Brig. Gen. Samuel Garland, was mortally wounded. Iverson's regiment ran away at the Battle of Antietam a few days later, although he was able to rally them to return to the battle. After the battle, Iverson was promoted to brigadier general on November 1, 1862, and given command of the brigade; causing the more senior Colonel Duncan K. McRae, who had been in temporary command, to resign from the Army. His first assignment commanding his new brigade was at the Battle of Fredericksburg, but he was assigned to the reserve and saw no action. Conflict soon resulted, however. When he attempted to name a new colonel for the 20th North Carolina, a personal friend from outside of the regiment, 26 of his officers signed a letter of protest against the action. Iverson attempted to arrest all 26 officers, but eventually cooled off. His friend was not placed as the new colonel, but Iverson petulantly refused all winter to promote any of the other candidates for the position.

At Chancellorsville, Iverson's brigade participated in Lt. Gen. Thomas J. "Stonewall" Jackson's famous flanking march, suffering heavy casualties (including Iverson himself, wounded in the groin by a spent shell), but managed to get less credit and notice than two other brigades in the line. Returning to the rear to get support for his flank, many of his officers concluded that he was shirking. His reasonable performance at Gaines's Mill the previous year forgotten, rumors swirled that he had achieved his command only by family political influence.

=== Gettysburg ===
The nadir of Iverson's career was at the Battle of Gettysburg, where on July 1, 1863, his brigade of North Carolinians unknowingly marched into an ambush to the northwest of town. The division of Maj. Gen. Robert E. Rodes began its attack from Oak Hill with the brigades of Col. Edward A. O'Neal and Iverson. The attack fell apart for multiple reasons. Rodes acted somewhat hastily, seeing limited Union forces at his front, but not that reinforcements were arriving from the town. Douglas Southall Freeman faulted Rodes for selecting two brigade commanders "who had not distinguished themselves in the battles of May" [i.e., Chancellorsville]. Because of a misunderstanding, O'Neal used only three of his four regiments and he attacked on a narrow front at a place different from where Rodes had carefully indicated. Although the two brigades were meant to attack in support of each other, there is confusion about who was supposed to move first. O'Neal's ineffective attack was repulsed, leaving Iverson's flank exposed. But the most significant problem was that the two brigade commanders chose not to lead their brigades in person, remaining behind their advance. After the battle there were rumors among the North Carolinians that Iverson was too drunk to lead, but his battle report indicated that he deliberately chose to remain behind and historians present no evidence that alcohol was involved in his decision.

In the words of the historian of the 23rd North Carolina, "unwarned, unled as a brigade, went forward Iverson's deserted band to its doom." As O'Neal's men fell back, Iverson's 1,350 men began to drift left toward a stone wall behind which veteran regiments of Brig. Gen. Henry Baxter's Union brigade were hidden. As the Confederates approached within 50 to 100 yards of the wall, the Union soldiers opened fire, hitting at least 500 men, felling them almost in parade-ground alignment. Most of the survivors of three of Iverson's regiments were captured by a Union countercharge.

From Iverson's vantage point, it seemed as if his brigade was surrendering, and he exclaimed to Rodes that his men were "cowards". Many of his men lay prone in battle formation while others waved white handkerchiefs. He did not realize that the former were dead or wounded and the latter surrounded and trapped under heavy fire. Upon reaching the front after conferring with Rodes, Iverson may have suffered a nervous breakdown, overwhelmed by the fate his men had suffered, possibly as many as 900 casualties, one of the most significant brigade losses at Gettysburg. (The men were later buried in shallow graves on this spot on Oak Ridge, which is known to locals as Iverson's Pits, and is a favorite site for believers in the supernatural.) Iverson was "unfit for command" for the rest of the battle. He commanded fragments of his brigade attached to the brigade of Brig. Gen. Stephen Dodson Ramseur.

During the retreat from Gettysburg, Iverson's brigade fought credibly against Union cavalry in Hagerstown, Maryland, but Gen. Robert E. Lee wanted nothing more to do with the tarnished officer. At Williamsport, Maryland, Lee assigned Iverson as temporary provost marshal, which removed him from combat command, reassigning his men to another brigade.

=== Georgia and North Carolina ===
He was removed altogether from the Army of Northern Virginia in October 1863, ordered back to Georgia to replace Maj. Gen. Henry R. Jackson in command of the state forces, headquartered at Rome. He spent several months reorganizing the Georgia troops in preparation for the defense of the state against Maj. Gen. William T. Sherman's Atlanta campaign.

In 1864, Iverson commanded a cavalry brigade in Maj. Gen. William T. Martin's division, Maj. Gen. Joseph Wheeler's cavalry corps, during the Atlanta Campaign. On July 29, near Macon, Iverson's 1,300 cavalrymen defeated about 2,300 under Maj. Gen. George Stoneman, taking about 200 prisoners. During Iverson's pursuit, he and his men captured an additional 500 at Sunshine Church on July 31, including Stoneman.

Iverson was on duty in North Carolina at the end of the war. As commander in Greensboro he watched his garrison slip away until it was unable to stop fugitive soldiers from plundering part of the city.

== Postbellum career ==
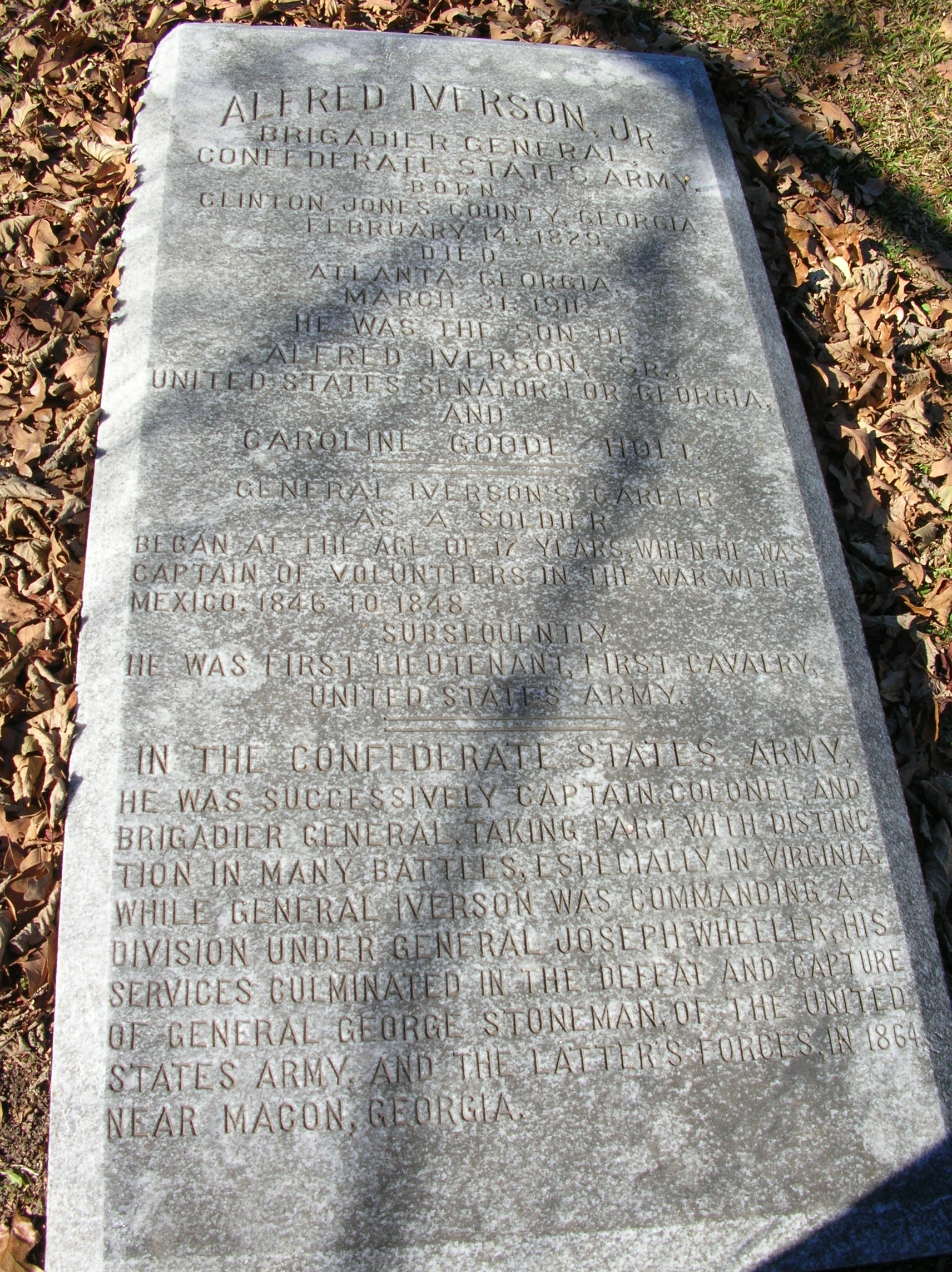
Grave of Alfred Iverson Jr., Oakland Cemetery, Atlanta, Georgia

After the war, Iverson engaged in business at Macon, moving to Florida in 1877 to farm oranges. He died in Atlanta, Georgia, and is buried there in Oakland Cemetery.

== See also ==
- List of American Civil War Generals (Confederate)
