= Tsali =

Cherokee leader (died 1838)

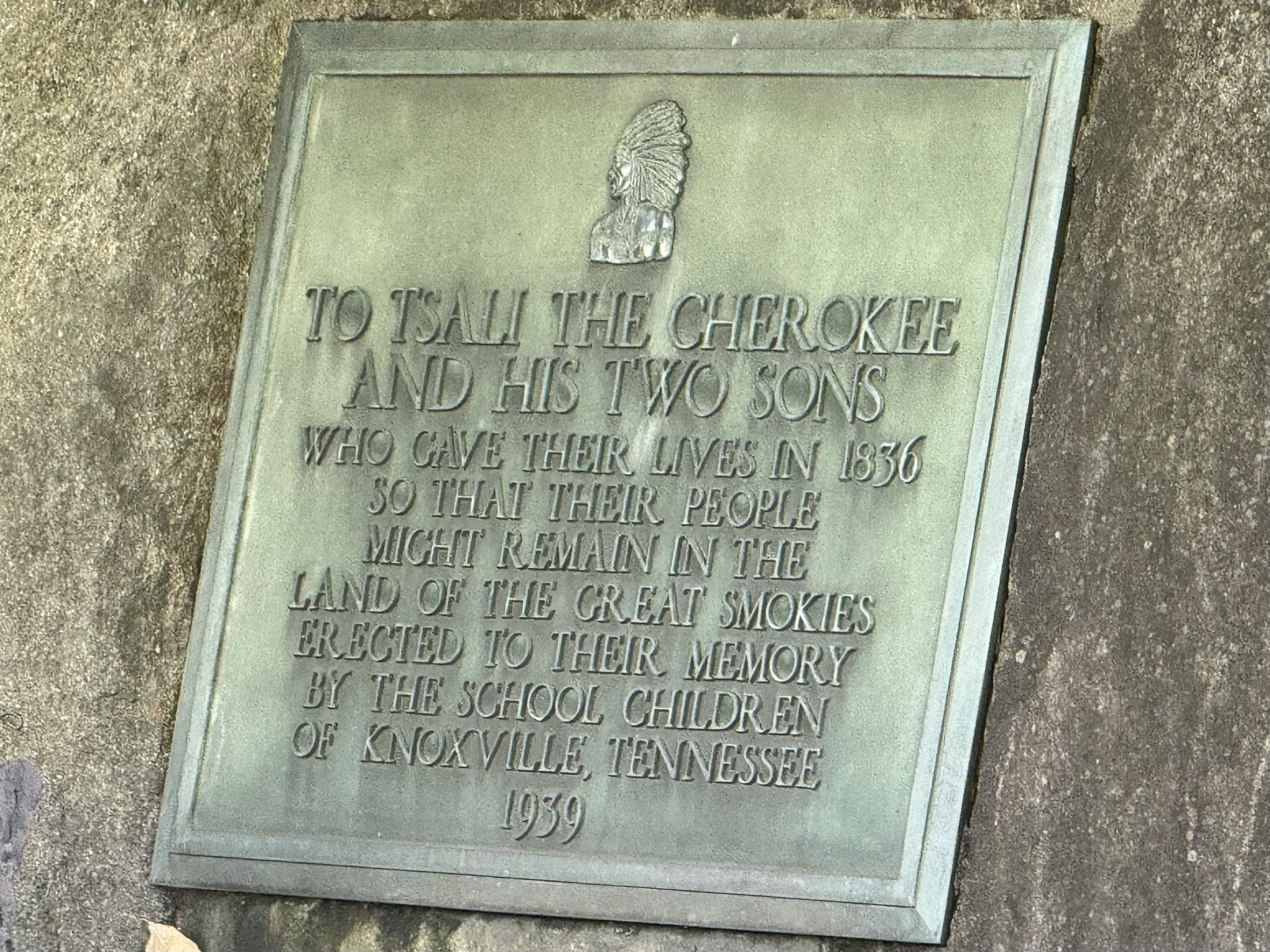
A monument dedicated to Tsali in Gatlinburg, Tennessee.

Tsali (Cherokee: ᏣᎵ) was a leader of the Cherokee during two different periods of the history of the tribe. As a young man, Tsali joined the Chickamauga faction of the Cherokee in the late 18th century, and became a leader in the fight against the American frontiersmen and their constant expansion into tribal lands. Later in 1812, he became known as The Prophet, and urged the Cherokee to ally with the Shawnee warrior, Tecumseh, in war against the Americans. Two decades later, in what seemed a fulfilment of his earlier prophecy, he resisted the forced removal of the Native Americans from their mountainous, western North Carolina towns, and as a result, a large following of like-minded Cherokee gathered to him. Following Tsali's martyrdom, the three hundred fugitive followers of his that remained free after his sacrifice became the forebears of some 14,000 registered members of the Eastern Band of the Cherokee Indians living today in the Qualla Boundary.

== Early life ==
Tsali was born and reared in the Cherokee settlement known as Coosawattee Town (Kusawatiyi). He followed the Chickamauga war chief, Dragging Canoe, from the time the latter migrated southwest during the American Revolutionary War and continuing through the Cherokee–American wars.

== The Prophet ==
During the turbulent years leading up to the War of 1812 and the Creek War, the traditionalist Tsali first became known as a major figure on the Cherokee national scene. The teachings of Tenskwatawa, known as the "Shawnee Prophet", began to filter down to the Native Americans of the Southeast, where they sparked a traditionalist cultural and religious revival. Tenskwatawa was the brother of Shawnee leader Tecumseh, who led a pan-Indian resistance against the Americans. Tenskwatawa's influence inspired what the later anthropologist James Mooney called the "Cherokee Ghost Dance movement." This revival increased Tecumseh's fame. He visited the council of the Upper Muscogee and representatives of the other tribes of the Southeast at Tukabatchee. He called on them to band together, abandon the ways of acculturation, and take up arms together in a united war against the Americans.

The Cherokee National Council had sent a small delegation led by Major Ridge (or "The Ridge"), to hear Tecumseh. He was generally well received but, when Tecumseh asked the Cherokee delegation when he could speak to their National Council, The Ridge replied that if Tecumseh set one foot inside the Cherokee Nation he would kill him. The chief considered him a threat to Cherokee stability, although Tecumseh had fought alongside many of the Cherokee leaders in the late 1780s during the Cherokee–American wars.

Some weeks after that Council, the 1812 New Madrid earthquake struck, affecting most of the continent of North America with aftershocks for weeks afterward. A legend quickly spread that after his rejection by the Cherokee at Tuckabatchee, Tecumseh had promised that when he returned home he would stomp his foot down on the earth so that the anger of the Great Spirit would come upon the Earth. In a Council meeting at Ustanali some weeks later, Tsali spoke in favor of an alliance with Tecumseh. The Ridge, widely acknowledged as the best orator among the Cherokee Nation, argued against what he had said. Supporters of Tsali attacked The Ridge, who was only saved by the intervention of a friend. The Ridge's defiance of Tsali caused the prophet to lose face with the Council, which had been at the point of voting nearly unanimously to support Tecumseh's war. Tsali prophesied a great apocalypse for the Cherokee Nation, and said the only safe haven would be the Smoky Mountains of western North Carolina, to which he then departed.

At that time, the National Council also refused The Ridge's efforts to gain support for the Americans in their conflict with the British during the War of 1812. The Council only got involved in the Creek War after allying themselves to the Lower Muscogee in order to defeat the Red Sticks.

== Resistance to Cherokee removal ==
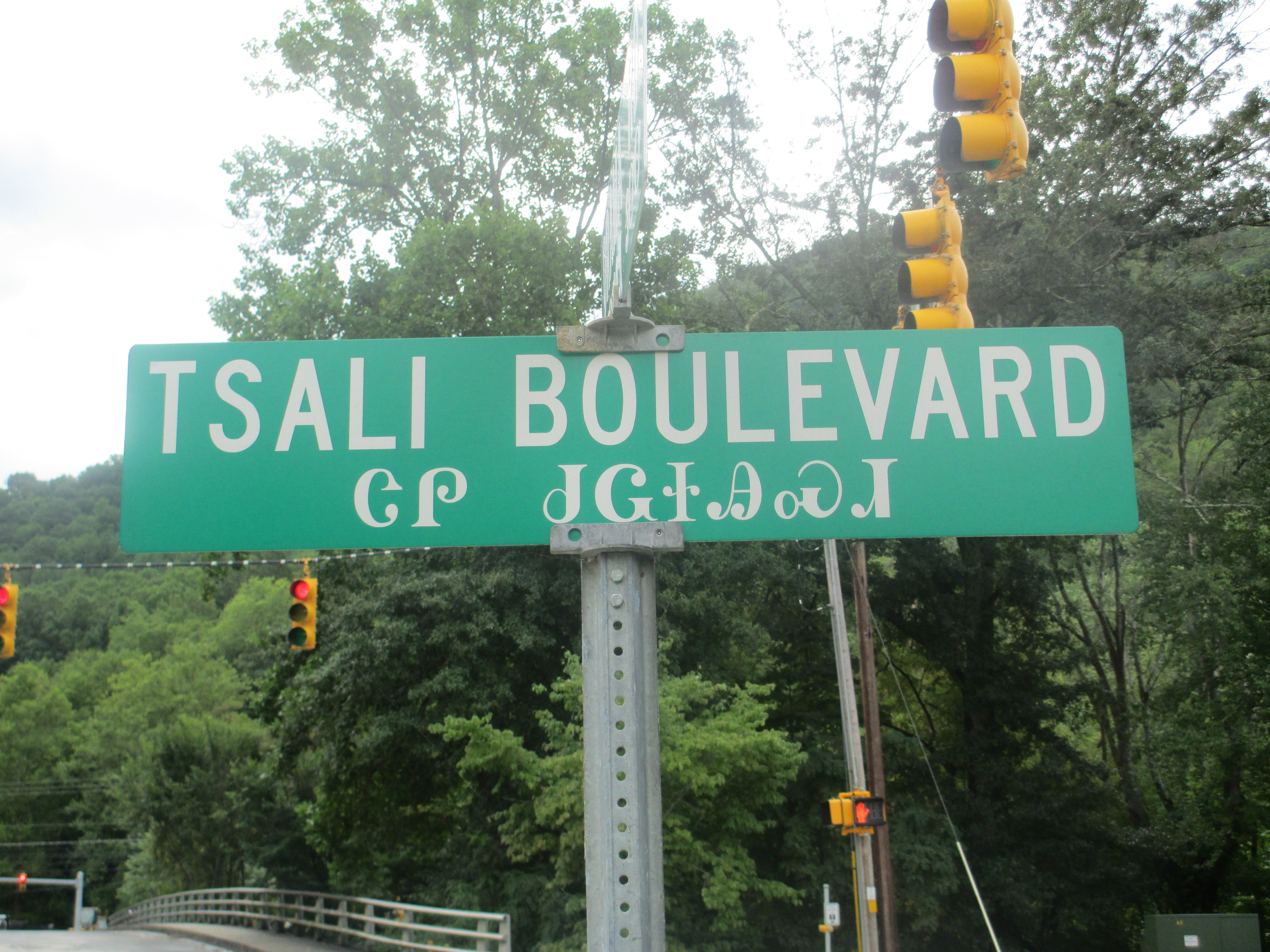
Tsali Boulevard in Cherokee, North Carolina

After the 1835 Treaty of New Echota, the federal government began to round up the Cherokee in preparation for the forced removal to what was to become Indian Territory. During this round up, a group of soldiers came into the small group of farmsteads owned by Tsali's extended family in the Snowbird Mountains of western North Carolina. Tsali and his family—including his wife, brother, their three sons and their families—were taken by surprise. They were marched at bayonet point toward the regional Indian Agency on the Hiwassee River. At one point, Tsali's wife paused to care for the needs of her baby, and one of the guards whipped her and prodded her with his bayonet, and forced her on her way. According to Mollie Sequoyah who substantiated the account by Tsali's son, Wasitani, "Then the other one [soldier] got with a horse whip. He beat her up with a horse whip. Then after a while they went and pick up both of them, her and the baby. Then they went and set on the horse. As soon as the horse moved, then that lady, she's trying to fall off and she got her foot hung in that stirrup. Then her baby dropped. It went that way, out yonder, and bust the head. And it died right then. That's how Charley [Tsali] got mad. He and his boys just used a stick and beat up, they killed 2 soldiers.. . . . They killed 2 and then the other one [escaped]."

Tsali and his relatives fled to the mountains and hid out for some time in a mountain cave in the Great Smoky Mountains. The cave where they hid was possibly under Kuwohi. The Army and General Winfield Scott needed to find a way out of the situation in which they found themselves. For all concerned, they needed a scapegoat and found one in Tsali. He did not have enough troops to track down the Indians in the rugged region, nor was he certain that he wanted to.

== Surrender and death ==
General Scott eventually enlisted the services of William Holland Thomas, a white attorney who had been adopted into the tribe in his youth. He had also represented the tribe in negotiations with the federal government regarding the removals. Thomas was given a message to the leader (Chief Lichen) of the fugitives. If Tsali and his family would surrender themselves to military justice, the rest of the Cherokee in the mountains could remain free. Upon hearing this, Tsali, his brother, and his sons came down from the mountains and gave themselves up.

Tsali, Lowney (his Brother) and Ridges (his Son) were executed. Tsali's youngest boy, Wasitani, was spared, and he later recounted that his family had been shot by a firing squad that ". . . was commanded by Euchella, a fellow fugitive. The majority of the squad was made up . . . of Indians of the treaty (New Echota Treaty) party. This made the execution all the more humiliating. The rest of Tsali's large family was allowed to remain under the umbrella of the Eastern Band.

== Legacy ==
Tsali Boulevard, a major artery of traffic in Cherokee, North Carolina, is named in his honor. A highly fictionalized account of the affair can be seen in the annual presentation of a Cherokee drama at the Qualla Boundary in the play, Unto These Hills, which was written by Kermit Hunter in 1950, a story that survives close to the scene of its original enactment.

== Sources ==
- Bedford, Denton R. Tsali. (San Francisco: The Indian Historian Press, 1972).
- Brown, John P. Old Frontiers: The Story of the Cherokee Indians from Earliest Times to the Date of Their Removal to the West, 1838. (Kingsport: Southern Publishers, 1938).
- Eckert, Allan W. A Sorrow in Our Heart: The Life of Tecumseh. (New York: Bantam, 1992).
- McLoughlin, William G. Cherokee Renascence in the New Republic. (Princeton: Princeton University Press, 1992).
- Mooney, James. Myths of the Cherokee and Sacred Formulas of the Cherokee. (Nashville: Charles and Randy Elder-Booksellers, 1982).
- Wilkins, Thurman. Cherokee Tragedy: The Ridge Family and the Decimation of a People. (New York: Macmillan Company, 1970).
