= Yonaguska =

Cherokee Chief

- ᏲᎾᎬᏍᎩ

Principal Chief of the Eastern Band of Cherokee Indians
- In office 1824–1839
- Preceded by: Office established
- Succeeded by: Salonitah

Personal details
- Born: c. 1759 Anson County, North Carolina, British America
- Died: 1839 Soco, North Carolina, U.S.

Yonaguska (Cherokee: ᏲᎾᎬᏍᎩ, romanized: Yonagvsgi; c. 1759–1839), who was known as Drowning Bear (the English meaning of his name), was a leader among the Cherokee of the Lower Towns of North Carolina.

During the Indian Removal of the late 1830s, he was the only chief who remained in the hills to rebuild the Eastern Band of Cherokee Indians, joined by others who had escaped or eluded the United States soldiers. Before that time, he had adopted William Holland Thomas as his son; the fatherless European-American youth was working at the trading post and had learned Cherokee. Yonaguska taught him Cherokee ways and, after Thomas became an attorney, he represented the tribe in negotiations with the federal government. Thomas was never a Chief of any Cherokee band but played important roles. Thomas bought land and established a Cherokee reserve for the tribe's use at what is now the Qualla Boundary, the territory of the federally recognized tribe in North Carolina.

During his life, Yonaguska was a reformer and a prophet; he was a leader who recognized the destructive power of the white man's liquor and the settlers' insatiable greed for Cherokee lands.

== Early life ==
Yonaguska was born about 1759 in the Cherokee Lower Towns of present-day North Carolina and Georgia. According to the Cherokee matrilineal system of inheritance and descent, he was considered born into his Cherokee mother's clan, where he gained his status. As a boy of 12, Yonaguska had a vision that the European Americans threatened the Cherokee way of life, but people did not pay attention when he spoke of it. At age 17, he witnessed widespread destruction by Gen. Griffith Rutherford and his North Carolina militia, who in 1776 burned 36 Cherokee towns during the military action. The Cherokee had been allied with the British, and the colonials were trying to discourage them from acting in the coming revolution.

Yonaguska was described as a strikingly handsome man, strongly built, and standing 6 feet 3 inches (1.91 m). He suffered from becoming addicted to alcohol as a young man. He and his wife adopted as their son William Holland Thomas, a fatherless European-American youth who worked at the trading post at Qualla Town and learned the Cherokee language. Thomas learned many Cherokee ways.

== Awakening ==
In 1819 when he was 60 years old, Yonaguska became critically ill. He had a vision, which he told his people after recovering. His message from the spirit world was that, "The Cherokee must never again drink whiskey. Whiskey must be banished."

He had Will Thomas write out a pledge: "The undersigned Cherokees, belonging to the town of Qualla agree to abandon the use of spirituous liquors." Yonaguska signed it, followed by the council (chiefs of the clans) and town residents. From the signing of the pledge until Yonaguska's death in 1839 at the age of 80, the Eastern Band of Cherokee Indians refrained from using liquor. On the few occasions when he learned of someone breaking the pledge, Yonaguska had the culprit whipped.

Throughout the early 19th century, federal agents tried to persuade Yonaguska to remove his people to lands west of the Mississippi River. He firmly resisted their efforts, declaring that the Cherokee were safer among their rocks and mountains, and belonged in their ancestral homeland. Other chiefs made the Treaty of 1819, by which they sold Cherokee lands along the Tuckasegee River. At the time, Yonaguska was given 640 acres (2.6 km^{2}) set aside in a bend of the river between Ela and Bryson City, including the ancient Mississippian culture site of Kituwa, which the Cherokee held sacred.

As pressure increased by the federal government for removal of Indians from the Southeast, Yonaguska rejected every offer for land exchange and subsidies. Having seen European-American settlers push westward through North Carolina, he did not believe they would ever be satisfied. He did not want to leave his homeland and face more removal pressure later. He thought the United States government promises of protection were "too often broken; they are like the reeds in yonder river—they are all lies."

The missionary Samuel Goodenough worked with Elias Boudinot to translate and print the Gospel of St Matthew in Cherokee. Yonaguska insisted on hearing it read to him before allowing its circulation. He reportedly said about the gospel:

Well, it seems a good book - strange that the white people are no better, after having had it so long.

Yonaguska approved the distribution of the scriptures to his people.

== Eastern Band of Cherokee Indians ==
The treaties of 1817 and 1819 with the federal government reduced the territory of the Cherokee Nation in North Carolina, as they gave up land to European-American settlers. In 1824 Yonaguska gathered the remaining Cherokee outside the new boundaries.

They settled together at Soco Creek on lands purchased for them by his adopted son, Will Thomas, as the Cherokee, at that time, were not allowed to buy land outside their nation. Although adopted as Yonaguska's son, Thomas was still considered "white" under the law and could legally buy land; he could also allow the Cherokee to live on "his" property. Purchased for the use of the Cherokee, his land was the basis of Qualla Boundary. It is now the territory of the Eastern Band of Cherokee Indians, a federally recognized tribe.

== Death ==
Shortly before his death in April 1839, Yonaguska was carried into the town house at Soco, where he gave a last talk to his people. The old man commended Thomas to them as their chief and warned them against ever leaving their own country. Wrapping his blanket around him, he quietly lay back and died.

Yonaguska was buried beside Soco Creek, about a mile below the old Macedonia mission, with a mound of stones to mark the spot.

== Sources ==
- Blankenship, Bob. Cherokee Roots, Volume 1: Eastern Cherokee Rolls. (Cherokee: Bob Blankenship, 1992).
- Brown, John P. Old Frontiers: The Story of the Cherokee Indians from Earliest Times to the Date of Their Removal to the West, 1838. (Kingsport: Southern Publishers, 1938).
- Ehle, John. The Trail of Tears: The Rise and Fall of the Cherokee Nation. (New York: Doubleday, 1989).
- Finger, John R. The Eastern Band of Cherokees 1819-1900. (Knoxville: University of Tennessee Press, 1984).
- Lumpkin, Wilson. The Removal of the Cherokee Indians from Georgia. (New York: Augustus M. Kelley, 1907).
- Mooney, James. Myths of the Cherokee and Sacred Formulas of the Cherokee. (Nashville: Charles and Randy Elder-Booksellers, 1982).
- Smithsonian Institution, Mooney's American Bureau of Ethnology Records, Photograph of Katalsta & Ewi Katalsta, daughter & granddaughter of Yonaguska/Yanaguski.
- Hicks, James R. "Cherokee Lineages," Register Report of Drowning Bear
- Virginia Moore Carney, Eastern Band Cherokee Women - Cultural Persistence in Their Letters and Speeches, Knoxville: University of Tennessee Press, 2005
- Donal F. Lindsey, Indians At Hampton Institute 1877-1923, Urbana and Chicago: University of Illinois Press, 1995
