= 20th North Carolina Infantry Regiment =

Infantry regiment of the Confederate States Army

- Flag of North Carolina adopted on June 22, 1861
- Active: July 1861 to April 1865
- Country: Confederate States of America
- Allegiance: North Carolina
- Branch: Confederate States Army
- Type: Regiment
- Role: Infantry
- Engagements: Peninsula Campaign; Battle of Chancellorsville; Battle of Gettysburg; Overland Campaign; Valley Campaigns of 1864; Appomattox Campaign

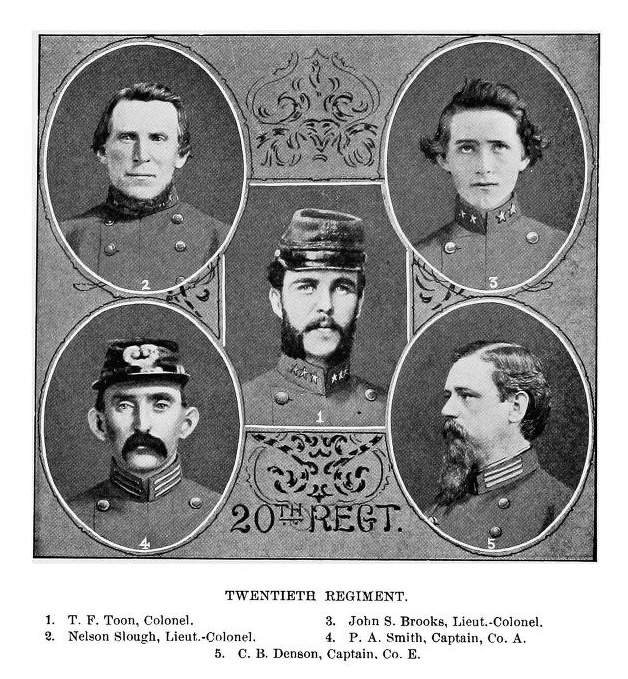
Officers of the 20th North Carolina Infantry

The 20th North Carolina Infantry Regiment was an infantry regiment in the Confederate States Army. It was part of the Army of Northern Virginia for most of the war.

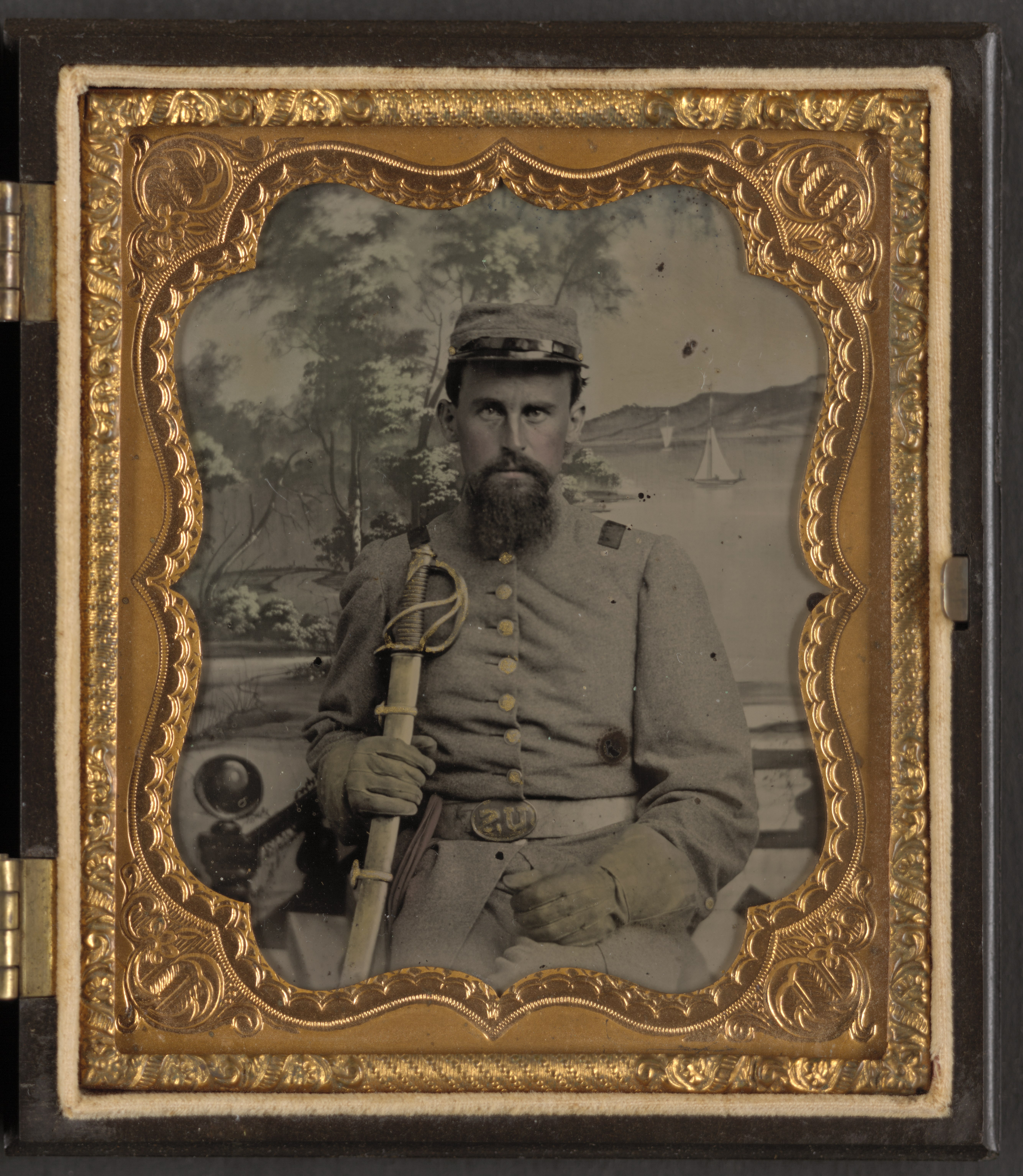
Lieutenant Robert Pryor James of Co. E, 20th North Carolina Infantry Regiment

== History ==
The regiment was organized at Smithville and Fort Caswell, North Carolina, in June, 1861. Its companies were recruited from the counties of Brunswick, Columbus, Cabarrus, Duplin, and Sampson counties. Alfred Iverson, Jr. was the regiment's first colonel, with Frank Faison as lieutenant colonel, and William H. Toon as major. It was first assigned to garrison duties in the coastal areas of North Carolina before being transferred to Samuel Garland, Jr.'s brigade, D. H. Hill's division of the Army of Northern Virginia in June 1862. It fought in the Peninsula Campaign and Maryland Campaign. Following Garland's mortal wounding in the Battle of South Mountain, Iverson was promoted to brigadier general and took command of the brigade.

In the spring of 1863, Captain Thomas F. Toon was promoted to colonel of the regiment. In the Battle of Chancellorsville, he was wounded, so Lieutenant Colonel Nelson Slough commanded the regiment in the Battle of Gettysburg. T. F. Toon recovered in time to return to command for the Overland Campaign. The regiment was detached with the rest of the Second Corps to the Shenandoah Valley for the summer and fall of 1864.

The regiment returned to the rest of the Army of Northern Virginia in March 1865 and participated in the Appomattox Campaign. It surrendered at Appomattox Courthouse on April 9, with four officers and 71 enlisted men remaining in the regiment.

== See also ==
- List of North Carolina Confederate Civil War units
