= Battle of Fort Stedman order of battle: Union =

The following Union Army units and commanders fought in the Battle of Fort Stedman (March 25, 1865) during the Petersburg Campaign of the American Civil War. Even though the IX Corps was the principal Union participant between 4:30 and 8:00 a.m., the time period which centrally defines this Battle, desultory skirmishing was officially reported by elements of the II, V and VI Corps and produced casualties in these Corps on the day of battle. Order of battle is compiled from the official reports which observed casualties. The Confederate order of battle is listed separately.

== Military Rank Abbreviations Used ==
- MG = Major General
- BG = Brigadier General
- Col = Colonel
- Ltc = Lieutenant Colonel
- Maj = Major
- Cpt = Captain
- Lt = Lieutenant

=== Other ===
- w = wounded
- mw = mortally wounded
- k = killed
- c = captured

== Army of the Potomac ==
=== II Corps ===
MG Andrew A. Humphreys

Division	Brigade	Regiments and Others
First Division; BG Nelson A. Miles	1st Brigade Col George W. Scott	26th Michigan: Lt Harris H. Hickock (w); 5th New Hampshire: Maj James E. Larkin; 61st New York: Col George W. Scott; 111th New York: Ltc Lewis W. Husk; 81st Pennsylvania: Ltc William Wilson; 140th Pennsylvania: Cpt Samuel S. Kerr
First Division; BG Nelson A. Miles	2nd Brigade Col Robert Nugent; Cpt Patrick H. Bird	28th Massachusetts: Ltc James Flemming (w); 63rd New York: Cpt William. H. Terwilliger; 69th New York: Col James J. Smith; 88th New York: Cpt John Smith; 126th New York: Cpt I. Hart Wilder
First Division; BG Nelson A. Miles	3rd Brigade Col Augustus Funk	39th New York: Maj John McE. Hyde; 53rd New York: Ltc Henry M. Karples
First Division; BG Nelson A. Miles	4th Brigade Col William M. Mintzer	53rd Pennsylvania Veterans: Col George C. Anderson; 148th Pennsylvania: Cpt Alfred A. Rhinehart
Second Division [not engaged]		
Third Division; Bvt MG Gershom Mott	1st Brigade BG P. Regis De Trobriand	20th Indiana: Cpt John W. Shafer; 40th New York: Ltc Madison M. Cannon; 86th New York: Col Nathan H. Vincent; 99th Pennsylvania: Cpt Frederick W. Lewis; 110th Pennsylvania: Cpt John B. Fite
Third Division; Bvt MG Gershom Mott	2nd Brigade BG Byron R. Pierce	17th Maine: Ltc William Hobson; 1st Massachusetts Heavy Artillery: Maj Nathaniel Shatswell; 5th Michigan: Col John Pulford; 93rd New York: Ltc Haviland Gifford; 57th Pennsylvania: Ltc Joseph H. Horton
Third Division; Bvt MG Gershom Mott	3rd Brigade BG Robert McAllister	7th New Jersey: Col Francis Price; 8th New Jersey: Maj Henry Hartford; 11th New Jersey: Cpt Charles F. Gage; 120th New York: Maj Walter F. Scott

=== V Corps ===
MG Gouverneur K. Warren

Division	Brigade	Regiments and Others
First Division; BG Charles Griffin	1st Brigade BG Joshua L. Chamberlain	198th Pennsylvania
First Division; BG Charles Griffin	2nd Brigade [not engaged]	
First Division; BG Charles Griffin	3rd Brigade BG Joseph J. Bartlett	155th Pennsylvania Infantry (Detached): 20th Maine Infantry: Ltc Walter G. Morrill; 16th Michigan; 83rd Pennsylvania Infantry: Col Chauncey P. Rogers; 118th Pennsylvania Infantry: Ltc Henry O'Neill
Second Division [not engaged]		
Third Division [not engaged]		

=== VI Corps ===
MG Horatio G. Wright

Division	Brigade	Regiments and Others
First Division; MG Frank Wheaton	1st Brigade [not engaged]	
First Division; MG Frank Wheaton	2nd Brigade BG Joseph E. Hamblin	2nd Connecticut Heavy Artillery: Col James Hubbard; 65th New York Infantry: Ltc Henry C. Fisk; 121st New York Infantry: Col Egbert Olcott; 95th Pennsylvania Infantry: Ltc John Harper
First Division; MG Frank Wheaton	3rd Brigade Col Oliver Edwards	37th Massachusetts; 82nd Pennsylvania; 119th Pennsylvania; 2nd Rhode Island; 5th Wisconsin
Second Division; BG George W. Getty	1st Brigade Col James M. Warner	93rd Pennsylvania: Ltc David C. Keller (w)
Second Division; BG George W. Getty	2nd Brigade MG Lewis A. Grant	2nd Vermont Infantry: Ltc Amasa S. Tracy; 3rd Vermont Infantry: Col Horace W. Floyd; 4th Vermont Infantry: Col Horace W. Floyd; 6th Vermont Infantry: Ltc Sumner H. Lincoln; 10th Vermont Infantry: Ltc George B. Damon
Second Division; BG George W. Getty	3rd Brigade [not engaged]	
Third Division; BG Truman Seymour	1st Brigade [not engaged]	
Third Division; BG Truman Seymour	2nd Brigade BG J. Warren Keifer	110th Ohio: Col Otho H. Binkley; 122nd Ohio: Ltc Charles M. Cornyn; 126th Ohio: Ltc Thomas W. McKinnie; 67th Pennsylvania: Maj William G. Williams; 6th Maryland: Ltc Joseph C. Hill; 9th New York Heavy Artillery: Ltc James W. Snyder

=== IX Corps ===
MG John G. Parke

Division	Brigade	Regiments and Others
First Division Bvt MG Orlando B. Willcox	1st Brigade [not engaged]	
First Division Bvt MG Orlando B. Willcox	2nd Brigade Col Ralph Ely	1st Michigan Sharpshooters: Cpt Ira L. Evans, 1Lt Edward J. Buckee; 2nd Michigan: Cpt John C. Boughton; 20th Michigan: Cpt Albert A. Day; 46th New York: Ltc Adolph Becker; 60th Ohio: Ltc Martin P. Avery; 50th Pennsylvania: Maj Samuel K. Schwenk
First Division Bvt MG Orlando B. Willcox	3rd Brigade Bvt BG Napoleon B. McLaughlen (c); Bvt Col Gilbert P. Robinson	3rd Maryland: Cpt John F. Burch; 3rd Maryland Veterans: Cpt Joseph F. Carter; 29th Massachusetts: Cpt John M. Deane; 57th Massachusetts: Cpt James Doherty (mw), Ltc Julius M. Tucker; 59th Massachusetts: Maj Ezra P. Gould; 100th Pennsylvania: Ltc Joseph H. Pentecost (mw), Maj Norman J. Maxwell
First Division Bvt MG Orlando B. Willcox	Artillery	14th New York Heavy Artillery: Maj George M. Rall
First Division Bvt MG Orlando B. Willcox	Acting Engineers	17th Michigan Infantry: Maj Thomas Mathews
Second Division [not engaged]		
Third Division BG John F. Hartranft	1st Brigade Col Charles W. Diven (w); Ltc William H. H. McCall	200th Pennsylvania: Ltc William H. H. McCall; 208th Pennsylvania: Ltc Mish T. Heintzelman; 209th Pennsylvania: Ltc George W. Frederick
Third Division BG John F. Hartranft	2nd Brigade Col Joseph A. Mathews	205th Pennsylvania: Maj B. Mortimer Morrow; 207th Pennsylvania: Col Robert C. Cox; 211th Pennsylvania: Cpt William A. Coulter
Artillery Bvt BG John C. Tidball Maj Theodore Miller, Inspector of Artillery		1st Connecticut Heavy, Battery I; 1st Connecticut Heavy, Battery K; 1st Connecticut Heavy, Battery L: Lt Robert Lewis; Maine Light, 7th Battery: Cpt Adelbert B. Twitchell; Massachusetts Light, 9th Battery; Massachusetts Light, 11th Battery: Cpt Edward J. Jones; Massachusetts Light, 14th Battery; New Jersey Light, 3rd Battery; 1st New York Light, Battery G; 8th New York Heavy, Battery L: Cpt John R. Cooper; 8th New York Light, Battery G; New York Light, 19th Battery: Cpt Edward W. Rogers; New York Light, 27th Battery: Cpt John B. Eaton; New York Light, 34th Battery: Maj Jacob Roemer (w); 1st Pennsylvania Light, Battery B; Pennsylvania Light, Battery D: Cpt Samuel H. Rhoads; 5th United States, Battery C and Battery I: Lt Valentine H. Stone
