= 56th North Carolina Infantry Regiment =

Infantry regiment of the Confederate States Army

- Country: Confederate States of America
- Allegiance: North Carolina
- Branch: Confederate States Army
- Type: Infantry
- Engagements: Battle of Five Forks

The 56th North Carolina Infantry Regiment was an infantry regiment that served in the Confederate Army during the American Civil War.

== Overview ==
The North Carolina 56th Infantry Regiment was instituted in July, 1862, at Camp Magnum, North Carolina. The infantry recruitment included counties like, Camden, Cumberland, Pasquotank, Northampton, Orange, Cleveland, Alexander, Rutherford, and Mecklenburg. The regiment was assigned to carry out reconnaissance between Goldsboro, Wilmington, and Tarboro. Later, the unit was stationed at Blackwater. The unit in collaboration with M.W. Ransom's Brigade was involved in battle at several places like Gum Swamp Creek, Plymouth, Drewry's Bluff, Petersburg and Appomattox.

The regiment lost 149 recruits who were taken as prisoners at the battle of Gum Swamp, suffered 4 fatalities and 84 wounded at Plymouth. Loss of lives at Ware Bottom Church numbered 90. The skirmish at Sailor's Creek resulted in many crippled men. Nine officers and 62 infantry reportedly surrendered with the Army of Northern Virginia. The field commander for the unit was Colonel Paul F. Faison. Lieutenant Colonel G. Gratiott Luke and Majors John W. Graham were supporting officers.

== Commanders ==
- Colonel Paul F. Faison

== See also ==
- List of North Carolina Confederate Civil War units
- North Carolina in the American Civil War
