= William Holland Thomas =

American politician (1805–1893)

- Wil-Usdi
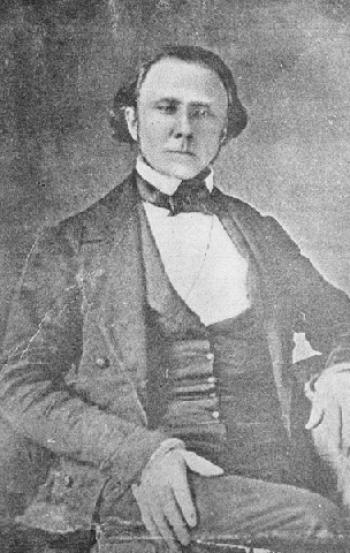
- Born: February 5, 1805; Near Mount Prospect, North Carolina, U.S.
- Died: May 10, 1893 (aged 88); Morganton, North Carolina, U.S.
- Resting place: Green Hill Cemetery, Waynesville, North Carolina
- Occupations: Attorney; Politician
- Spouse: Sarah Love
- Military service
- Allegiance: Confederate States of America
- Branch: Confederate States Army
- Service years: 1861–1865
- Rank: Colonel
- Commands: Thomas' Legion
- Conflicts: American Civil War

William Holland Thomas (February 5, 1805 – May 10, 1893) was an American merchant, lawyer, politician and soldier. He was the adopted son of Cherokee Chief Yonaguska and, while previously believed to have become a Chief of the Eastern Band of Cherokee Indians, has more recently been discovered after review of Cherokee documents by his descendant and avid researcher Elizabeth Avery Thomas that he was viewed as an esteemed friend of the Cherokee and was eventually appointed as the legal representative for the Eastern Band at the State and federal levels. Thomas was a Confederate Colonel who led the Thomas' Legion of Cherokee Indians during the American Civil War.

== Background ==
Thomas was born on Raccoon Creek, two miles (3 km) just outside what is now Waynesville, North Carolina. His mother's family, the Colvards, came from English immigrants who settled in Culpeper, Virginia. On his father's side he was related to President Zachary Taylor. It is believed that his father Richard drowned shortly before his son's birth.

He was the son of Temperance Thomas (née Colvard) and Richard Thomas, who died before he was born. He was raised by his mother on Raccoon Creek outside present-day Waynesville, North Carolina. At the age of 13 he was apprenticed to Felix Walker's store and trading post. There he learned to speak Cherokee and was befriended and later adopted by the chief/headman of the local Cherokees, Yonaguska. He was later adopted into the tribe as a whole. In April 1839, a dying Yonaguska picked Thomas as his successor as Principal Chief of the Qualla Cherokee, though this was disputed with Salonitah (aka Flying Squirrel), who also laid claim as Principal Chief. Officially, Salonitah is recognized as the second Principal Chief of the Eastern Band of Cherokee Indians (EBCI).

Thomas became a successful merchant and was a lifelong ally of the Eastern Cherokee. In 1819, Yonaguska had made the prescient decision to separate his group from the authority of the Cherokee Nation. The Qualla Cherokee became "citizenized" (they were under the authority of the state of North Carolina, but without the full rights of white citizens). In 1830, Will Thomas became the agent/attorney for the Qualla Cherokee. As the U.S., under President Andrew Jackson, pushed for full removal of the Native peoples of the Southeast, Will Thomas helped the North Carolina Cherokees resist removal by buying land for them. After a Cherokee man named Tsali (aka Charley) and his sons killed soldiers who had rounded them up for removal, Will Thomas acted as an intermediary between the Qualla Cherokees and the U.S. Army and helped find Tsali's hiding place. After the Cherokees executed Tsali, the Qualla Cherokee were granted the right to remain on their ancestral lands. The state of North Carolina, however, would continue to try and remove them, and Thomas represented the tribe in resisting those efforts. While it was his adopted father, Yonaguska, who planned and prepared the way for the Qualla Cherokees to remain east, Will Thomas worked in support of his adopted father's plan for decades after Yonaguska's death. With his own funds and those provided by the Cherokee, he bought land in North Carolina to be used by the Cherokee. Much of this property is now included in Qualla Boundary, the territory of the federally recognized Eastern Band of Cherokee.

During the Civil War, Thomas served as a colonel in the Confederate States Army. He led Thomas' Legion of Cherokee Indians and Highlanders.

== Adopted by Cherokee ==
As a boy, Thomas worked for US Congressman Felix Walker, clerking at his trading post on Soco Creek (in what is now the Qualla Boundary). Thomas worked at Walker's store for three years and lived at the store. He quickly became friends with the Cherokee who frequented the post and learned their language. Chief Yonaguska adopted Thomas. Thomas was given the Cherokee name Will-usdi (Little Will).

In about 1820 Felix Walker was forced to close his stores. The story is told that, unable to pay Thomas what he owed him, he gave the youth a set of law books. At the time states did not have bar exams. Men prepared to practice law by reading the law. Thomas, who was exceptionally bright, became well-versed in frontier law. Around 1830 Yonaguska asked him to become the Cherokees' legal representative.

Thomas opened his own trading post for the Qualla Town Cherokee. Later he opened several other trading posts in Western North Carolina.

== Marriage and family ==
Thomas married Sarah Jane Burney Love (1832–1877), the daughter of James Robert Love and Maria Coman Love. She was the fourth of their eight children. James Robert Love was the son of Robert Love, known as the founder of Waynesville, North Carolina.

== Negotiating for the Cherokee ==
In 1819, Yonaguska and other North Carolina Cherokees made the decision to become "citizenized" residents of North Carolina. They received land reserves of 640 acres (2.6 km^{2}) and were no longer part of the Cherokee Nation. Although technically the New Echota Treaty should not have applied to them, the Qualla Cherokee were justly apprehensive. While most Cherokee opposed ceding their lands in the Southeast, the men negotiating the New Echota Treaty believed that removal was inevitable, and hoped to make the best deal possible for their people. Will Thomas, already their agent/attorney, worked to secure their safety both on the state level and on the Federal level in Washington, D.C.

Yonaguska's citizenized Cherokees became the core of what is now Eastern Band, a federally recognized tribe.

In April 1839, Thomas was picked by Yonaguska as successor Principal Chief of the Qualla Cherokee. However, Salonitah also laid claim as Principal Chief because of his distrust of Thomas, though he never had full support of all the Qualla Cherokee. During the 1840s and 1850s, Thomas worked to gain recognition of the Cherokee as citizens of North Carolina and continued to purchase land for them in his name. At the time, Cherokee were prohibited from owning land outside the Indian Territory. Thomas's purchases became the basis of much of what is now known as the Qualla Boundary, the land base of the EBCI.

In 1848, Thomas was elected to the North Carolina State Senate; he was re-elected every two years through 1860.

== Civil War ==
When the Civil War broke out, Thomas organized a Legion of local Cherokees and whites to support the Confederacy. The 400 warriors he recruited formed two Cherokee companies; together with six companies of white men, many of whom were ethnic Scots-Irish, they comprised the Thomas' Legion of Cherokee Indians and Highlanders. It operated as an independent command directly under the Confederate Army's Department of East Tennessee. The Legion operated primarily in East Tennessee and Western North Carolina, except for a short period when they were deployed to the Shenandoah Valley.

Thomas' Legion was defeated at battles such as the Battle of Fisher's Hill and the Battle of Cedar Creek while deployed in the Shenandoah Valley in 1864. By May 1865, the main Confederate armies had surrendered and Union soldiers controlled Waynesville and the rest of Western North Carolina.

On May 6, 1865, Thomas' Legion fired "The Last Shot" of the Civil War east of the Mississippi River in an action at White Sulphur Springs, North Carolina. After his legion captured Waynesville, they voluntarily ceased hostilities upon learning of General Robert E. Lee's surrender and the end of the war.

Colonel Thomas and his Legion guarded the mountains surrounding Waynesville. During the night of May 5, 1865, they built hundreds of campfires to make the Union garrison think that thousands of Cherokee and Confederates were about to attack them. The Cherokee punctuated the nights with "chilling warwhoops" and "hideous yells," according to a Union report, firing occasional shots to improve the effect. The next morning Thomas and about 20 Cherokee entered Waynesville under a flag of truce to demand the surrender of the garrison. The Union troops did so. On May 9, 1865, however, a Union officer told Thomas that General Robert E. Lee had surrendered his army one month earlier, and the colonel agreed to lay down his arms. The Civil War was over, and the last shots in North Carolina were those fired in Waynesville.

== Postbellum years ==
After the war, Thomas went back to Stecoah, where he lived with his wife and three children. In 1866, he received a pardon from President Andrew Johnson, after which he hoped to reenter politics and business.

Thomas's mental condition began to deteriorate. Many historians have speculated about the causes of his insanity, but it is not yet known. He fell hopelessly into debt. Compounding his worries was his responsibilities among and with the Cherokee, who suffered a devastating smallpox epidemic after the war.

In March 1867, Thomas was declared insane and committed to a state mental hospital in Raleigh. From then until the end of his life in 1893, he lived in and out of mental hospitals. In 1887 Thomas was still able to assist the ethnologist James Mooney of the Smithsonian Institution by telling him of Cherokee history and lifeways. Mooney was doing research and field studies on the Cherokee in western North Carolina.

== Death and legacy ==
Thomas died in the state mental hospital in Morganton, North Carolina; he was buried in Green Hill Cemetery in Waynesville. He is remembered today as a figure in the outdoor drama Unto These Hills.

== Fictional accounts ==
Charles Frazier based his main character, Will Cooper, in his novel Thirteen Moons (2006), in part on William Holland Thomas. In the Author's Note, Frazier says that Will Cooper is not William Holland Thomas, "although they do share some DNA."

Writer Robert J. Conley (Cherokee) published Wil Usdi: Thoughts from the Asylum, a Cherokee Novella (2015), a fictional account of Thomas's life. His novella includes a foreword by Luther Wilson, and a tribute by Michell Hicks, Chief of the Eastern Band of Cherokee Indians.
