= 45th North Carolina Infantry Regiment =

Infantry regiment of the Confederate States Army

- Flag of North Carolina, 1861
- Active: March 1861 – April 1865
- Disbanded: April 1865
- Country: Confederate States of America
- Allegiance: North Carolina
- Branch: Confederate States Army
- Role: Infantry
- Engagements: American Civil War: Peninsula Campaign-Seven Days' Battles-Battle of Fredericksburg-Battle of Chancellorsville-Gettysburg campaign-Bristoe Campaign-Mine Run Campaign-Overland Campaign-Siege of Petersburg-Valley Campaigns of 1864-Appomattox Campaign

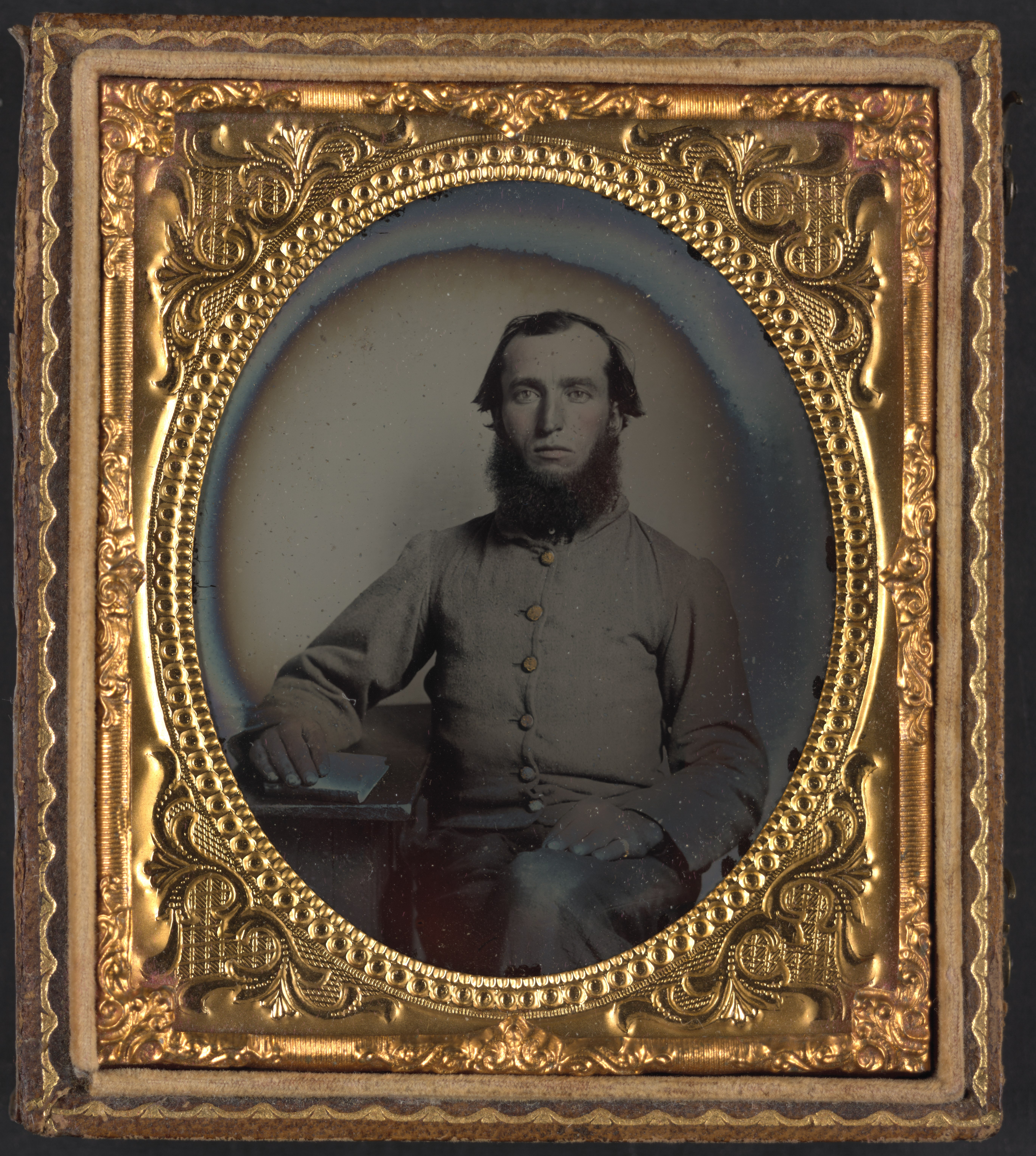
Joshua Whitten of 45th North Carolina Infantry Regiment

The 45th North Carolina Infantry Regiment was an infantry regiment that served in the Confederate Army during the American Civil War.

45th Infantry Regiment was organized at Camp Mangum, near Raleigh, North Carolina, in April, 1862, with men from Rockingham, Caswell, Guilford, and Forsyth counties. It served under the command of Generals Daniel and Grimes. After fighting at the Battle of Malvern Hill in Virginia, it returned to North Carolina and was stationed in the Kinston-New Bern area. During the spring of 1863 the unit moved north and took an active part in the campaigns of the Army of Northern Virginia from Gettysburg to Cold Harbor. It continued the fight with Jubal A. Early in the Shenandoah Valley and ended the war at Appomattox. It reported 2 killed and 14 wounded at Malvern Hill, lost about forty percent of the 570 engaged at Gettysburg, and sustained 2 casualties at Bristoe and 6 at Mine Run. The unit surrendered with 7 officers and 88 men.

The field officers were Colonels Samuel H. Boyd, Junius Daniel, John H. Morehead, and John R. Winston; Lieutenant Colonels Andrew J. Boyd and James S. Dalton; and Majors Samuel C. Rankin, Charles E. Shober, and T. McGehee Smith.

- Company A - Rockingham Zollicoffers
- Company B - Capt. Charles E. Shober's Co.
- Company C - Guilford Light Infantry
- Company D - Madison Greys
- Company E - Troublesome Boys
- Company F - Dan River Rangers
- Company G - Rockingham Rebels
- Company H - Rockingham Guards
- Company I - Border Rangers
- Company K - North State Boys

== See also ==
- List of North Carolina Confederate Civil War units
