= National Register of Historic Places listings in Great Smoky Mountains National Park =

This is a list of the National Register of Historic Places listings in Great Smoky Mountains National Park.

This is intended to be a complete list of the properties and districts on the National Register of Historic Places in Great Smoky Mountains National Park, North Carolina and Tennessee, United States. The locations of National Register properties and districts for which the latitude and longitude coordinates are included below, may be seen in a map.

There are 19 properties and districts listed on the National Register in the park.

This National Park Service list is complete through NPS recent listings posted June 20, 2025.

== Current listings ==
	Name on the Register	Image	Date listed	Location	City or town	Description
1	Mayna Treanor Avent Studio	Mayna Treanor Avent Studio	February 7, 1994 (#93001575)	Jake's Creek Trail, 1.0 mile south of Elkton; 35°38′21″N 83°35′15″W	Elkmont	
2	Cades Cove Historic District	Cades Cove Historic District	July 13, 1977 (#77000111)	10 miles southwest of Townsend in Great Smoky Mountains National Park; 35°35′13″N 83°48′54″W	Townsend	
3	Clingmans Dome Observation Tower	Clingmans Dome Observation Tower	August 15, 2012 (#12000515)	Terminus of Clingmans Dome Rd. 35°33′46″N 83°29′55″W	Bryson City	
4	Alex Cole Cabin	Alex Cole Cabin	January 2, 1976 (#76000165)	5 miles south of Gatlinburg off U.S. Route 441 in Great Smoky Mountains National Park; 35°39′59″N 83°31′22″W	Gatlinburg	
5	Elkmont Historic District, Great Smoky Mountains NP	Elkmont Historic District, Great Smoky Mountains NP	March 22, 1994 (#94000166)	Off State Route 72 southwest of Gatlinburg; 35°39′20″N 83°35′04″W	Gatlinburg	
6	Hall Cabin	Hall Cabin	January 30, 1976 (#76000162)	15 mi. NE of Fontana in Great Smoky Mountains National Park; 35°31′12″N 83°40′46″W	Fontana	
7	King-Walker Place	King-Walker Place	March 16, 1976 (#76000169)	West of Gatlinburg off State Route 73 in Great Smoky Mountains National Park; 35°41′39″N 83°37′45″W	Gatlinburg	
8	Little Greenbrier School-Church	Little Greenbrier School-Church	January 11, 1976 (#76000168)	About 9 miles west of Gatlinburg off State Route 73 in Great Smoky Mountains National Park; 35°41′01″N 83°38′17″W	Gatlinburg	
9	Look Rock Observation Tower	Look Rock Observation Tower	October 12, 2017 (#100001750)	Foothills Pkwy. W. 35°37′57″N 83°56′35″W	Walland vicinity	
10	Tyson McCarter Place	Tyson McCarter Place	March 16, 1976 (#76000204)	10 miles east of Gatlinburg on State Route 73 in Great Smoky Mountains National Park; 35°46′N 83°18′W	Gatlinburg	
11	Messer Barn	Messer Barn	January 1, 1976 (#76000166)	Southeast of Gatlinburg near Greenbrier Cove in Great Smoky Mountains National Park; 35°41′13″N 83°23′54″W	Gatlinburg	
12	Mingus Mill	Mingus Mill	November 29, 2016 (#16000808)	Newfound Gap Rd., Great Smoky Mountains National Park; 35°31′12″N 83°18′35″W	Cherokee	
13	Mount Cammerer Fire Lookout	Mount Cammerer Fire Lookout	June 12, 2019 (#100004091)	Great Smoky Mountains National Park (GRSM) - end of Mount Cammerer; 35°45′49″N 83°09′41″W	Cosby	
14	Bud Ogle Farm	Bud Ogle Farm	November 23, 1977 (#77000158)	3 miles southeast of Gatlinburg; 35°40′50″N 83°29′28″W	Gatlinburg	
15	Oconaluftee Archeological District		February 19, 1982 (#82001715)	Address Restricted	Cherokee	
16	Oconaluftee Baptist Church	Oconaluftee Baptist Church	January 1, 1976 (#76000163)	6 mi. N of Cherokee on U.S. 441 in Great Smoky Mountains National Park; 35°33′13″N 83°18′31″W	Cherokee	
17	Oconaluftee Ranger Station	Oconaluftee Ranger Station	November 29, 2016 (#16000809)	Newfound Gap Rd., Great Smoky Mountains National Park; 35°30′47″N 83°18′23″W	Cherokee	
18	John Ownby Cabin	John Ownby Cabin	January 1, 1976 (#76000167)	3 miles south of Gatlinburg off State Route 73 in Great Smoky Mountains National Park; 35°41′22″N 83°32′50″W	Gatlinburg	
19	Roaring Fork Historic District	Roaring Fork Historic District	March 16, 1976 (#76000170)	5 miles southeast of Gatlinburg off State Route 73 in Great Smoky Mountains National Park; 35°41′54″N 83°28′04″W	Gatlinburg	

== See also ==
- National Register of Historic Places listings in Sevier County, Tennessee
- National Register of Historic Places listings in Blount County, Tennessee
- National Register of Historic Places listings in Cocke County, Tennessee
- National Register of Historic Places listings in Swain County, North Carolina
- National Register of Historic Places listings in Tennessee
- National Register of Historic Places listings in North Carolina
