= Woolly Tops Mountain =

Mountain in Tennessee, United States

Highest point
- Elevation: 5,482 ft (1,671 m)
- Prominence: 177 ft (54 m)
- Coordinates: 35°40′37″N 83°20′22″W

Geography
- Location: Sevier County, Tennessee, U.S.
- Parent range: Appalachian Mountains, Blue Ridge Mountains, Great Smoky Mountains
- Topo map: USGS Mount Mingus

Climbing
- First ascent: Unknown
- Easiest route: Hike

Woolly Tops Mountain is a mountain in the Great Smoky Mountains in Sevier County, Tennessee. It has an elevation of 5,482 feet (1,671 m), and is located in the eastern half of the Great Smoky Mountains National Park.

== Description ==
Woolly Tops Mountain is a large massif oriented in an east–west direction, which reaches a maximum elevation of 5,482 feet (1,671 m). It is located approximately 3/4 mile (1.2 km) north of 5,907-foot (1,800 m) Laurel Top on the Tennessee-North Carolina state line. Although not served by an official trail, the mountain can be accessed via the Appalachian Trail from Laurel Top via a ridge between the two mountains. It rises approximately 3,500 feet (1,100 m) along its northern base from the Middle Prong of the Little Pigeon River, also known as Greenbrier Creek.

On August 12, 1944, a Beechcraft Model 17 Staggerwing from Oak Ridge, Tennessee, crashed into Woolly Tops Mountain. The wreckage was not discovered until January 19, 1947, by a group of hikers from the Smoky Mountain Hiking Club. The remains of the three occupants were reportedly never found.
