= Hall Cabin =

Historic house in North Carolina, United States

- U.S. National Register of Historic Places
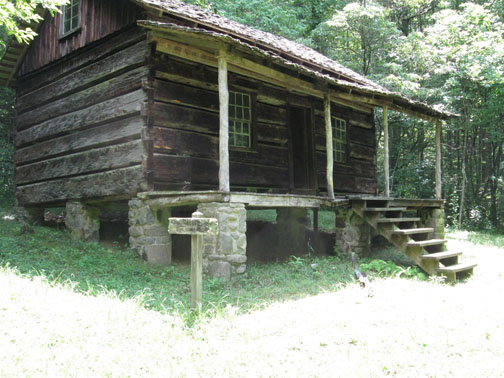

- Location within North Carolina Location within the United States
- Nearest city: Fontana, North Carolina
- Coordinates: 35°31′12″N 83°40′46″W
- Area: less than one acre
- Built: 1910
- NRHP reference No.: 76000162
- Added to NRHP: January 30, 1976

The Hall Cabin, also known as the J. H. Kress Cabin is a historic log cabin in Great Smoky Mountains National Park, about 15 miles (24 km) from Fontana, North Carolina. The cabin is a rectangular split-log structure 24 feet (7.3 m) wide and 17 feet (5.2 m) deep, with a porch spanning its front. The gable ends of the roof are sheathed in board-and-batten siding. It was built by a man named Hall in 1910, and underwent some remodeling around 1940 when J. H. Kress used it as a hunting lodge. It is located in the drainage of Hazel Creek, an area which historically had a small population and was abandoned after the construction of Fontana Lake and the national park. It is the only structure remaining in its immediate vicinity.

The cabin was listed on the National Register of Historic Places in 1976.

== See also ==
- National Register of Historic Places listings in Swain County, North Carolina
- National Register of Historic Places listings in Great Smoky Mountains National Park
