= Greenbrier (Great Smoky Mountains) =

Valley in Sevier County, Tennessee

Coordinates: 35.722°N 83.392°W

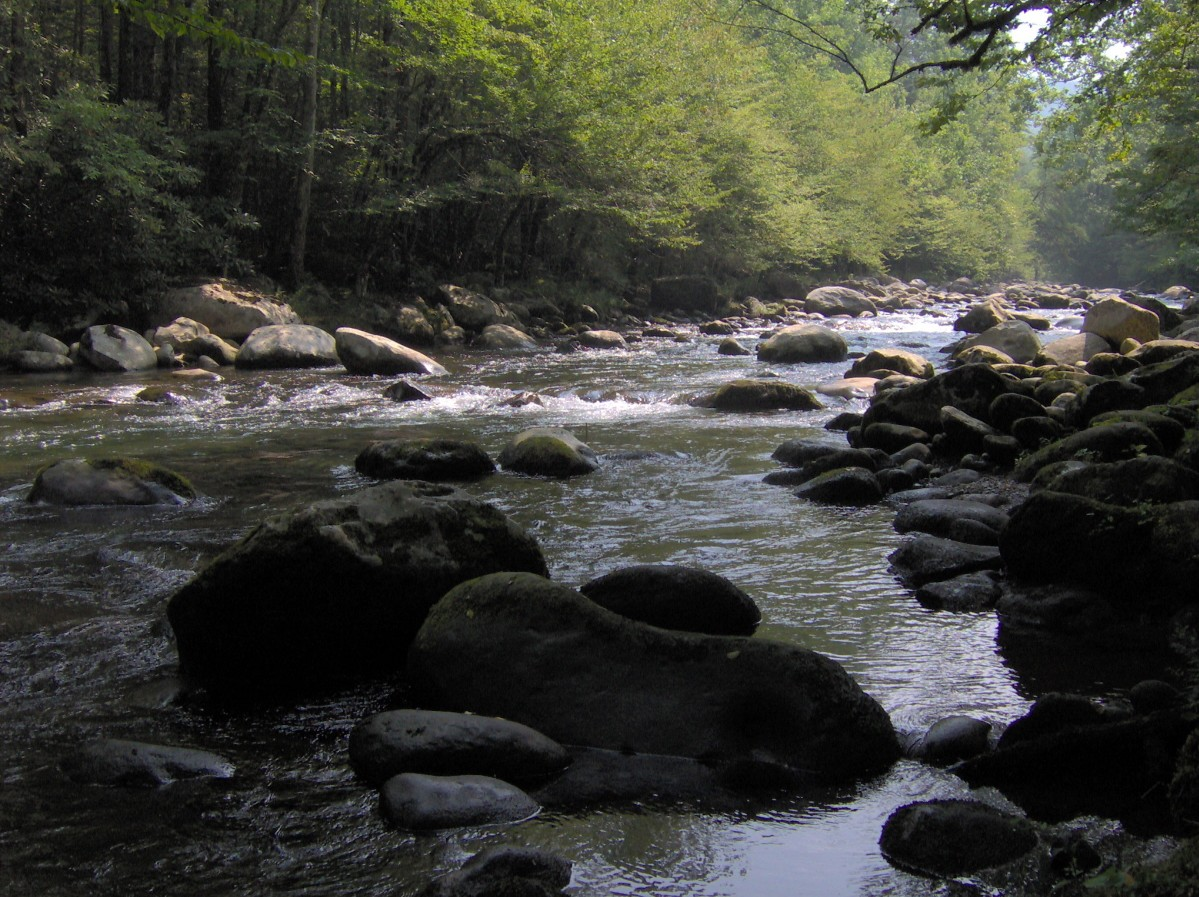
The Little Pigeon River in Greenbrier

Greenbrier is a valley in the northern Great Smoky Mountains of Tennessee, located in the southeastern United States. Now a recreational area located within the Great Smoky Mountains National Park, Greenbrier was once home to several Appalachian communities.

Greenbrier is situated along the Middle Fork of the Little Pigeon River, stretching from Porters Flat in the south to Emert's Cove in the north, at the present park boundary. The area also includes the Middle Fork's immediate watershed from the crest of Grapeyard Ridge to the west (opposite the Roaring Fork area) to Snag Mountain in the east. The area is sometimes called Big Greenbrier to distinguish it from Little Greenbrier, which is located between Wears Valley and Elkmont several miles to the west.

== Geology ==
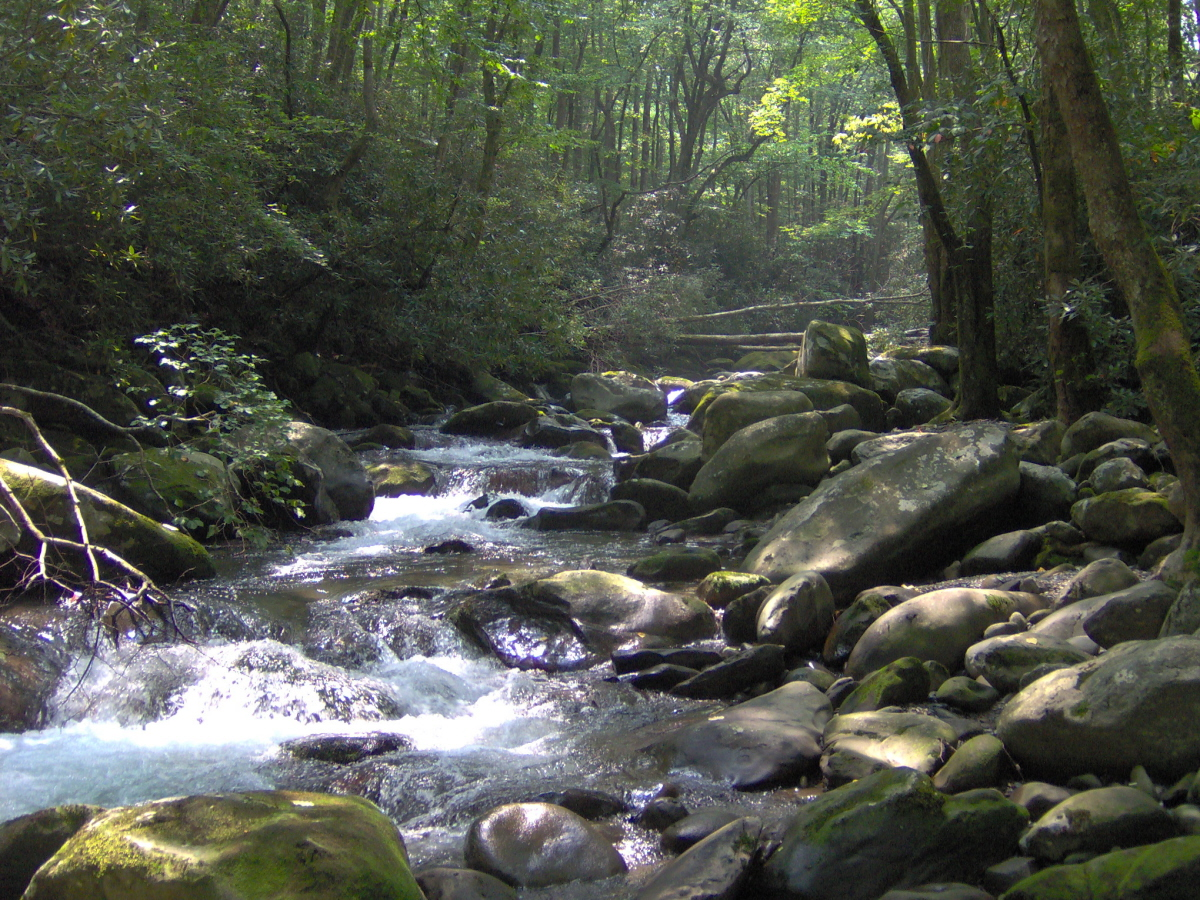
Boulders litter the streambed of Porters Creek in Greenbrier

The ridges surrounding Greenbrier are among the highest in the Appalachian range. To the east is the Guyot massif, which rises to over 6,000 feet (1,829 m) for long stretches. To the west is the Le Conte massif, which culminates in a 6,593-foot (2,009 m) summit. The ridge immediately to the south connecting the two massifs, known as "the Sawteeth," consists of a series of jagged, steep cliffs, the most well-known of which spans the northern face of Charlies Bunion. Greenbrier Pinnacle, a 7-mile (11 km) ridge descending from the western flank of Old Black westward to the Middle Fork valley, nearly closes off Greenbrier Cove entirely. Over a dozen streams flow north from the crest of the Pinnacle, each of them cutting narrow hollows with traces of fertile bottomland.

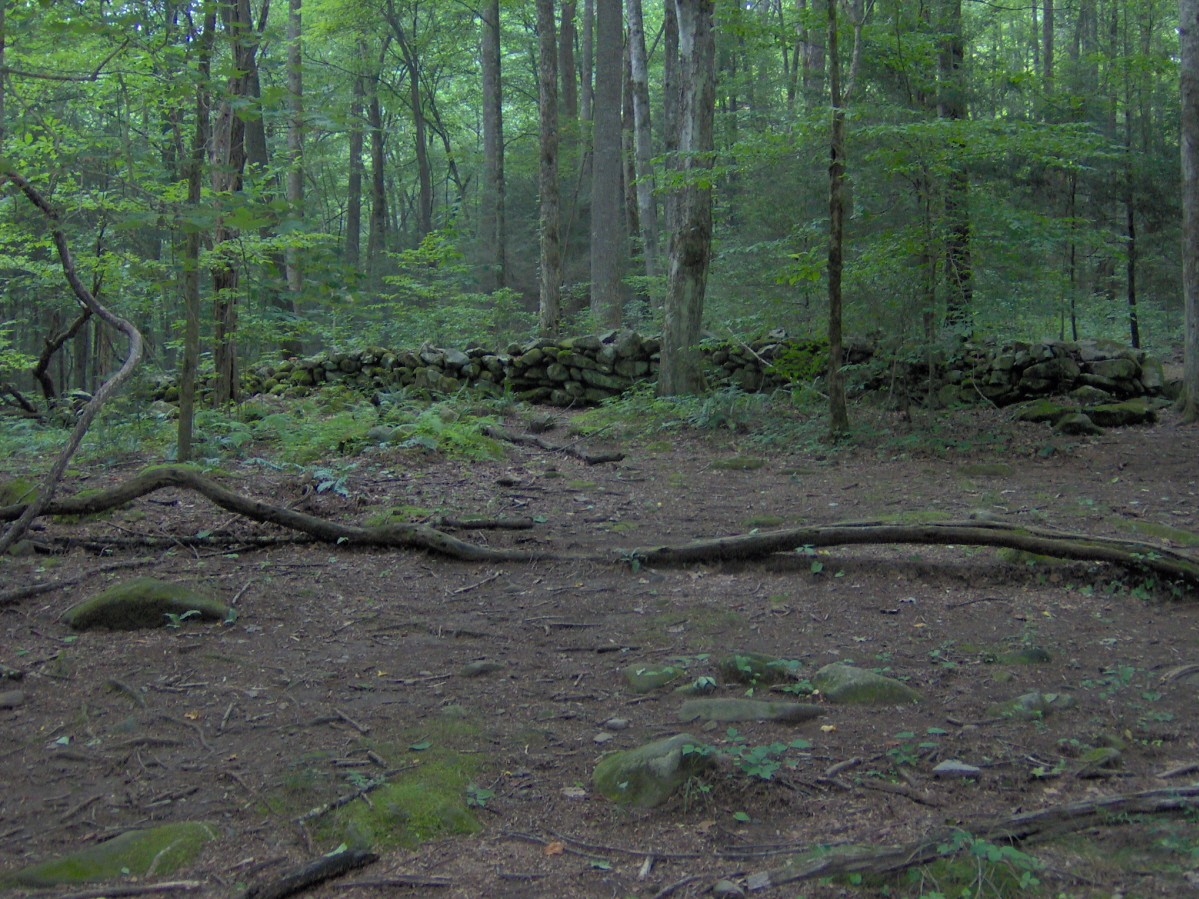
Rock wall at the old Cantrell homesite on Porters Creek

Greenbrier is underlain by a Precambrian metamorphic rock formation of the Ocoee Supergroup known as Roaring Fork Sandstone. This rock type, created from ancient ocean sediments 750 million years ago, dominates the mid-level elevations in the north-central Smokies. As the elevation increases to the south, a thrust fault known as the Greenbrier Fault separates the Roaring Fork sandstone from Thunderhead sandstone and Anakeesta Formation, both of which are common along the Smokies crests. To the north, as the land flattens out (near the park boundary), another thrust fault, the Gatlinburg Fault, separates the Roaring Fork formation from a layer of siltstone, which underlies the foothills around Emert's Cove.

Like the Sugarlands and Roaring Fork to the west, Greenbrier's bottomlands and streambeds are coated with sandstone, phyllite, and slate rocks of all sizes. During the Ice Ages, the cold weather caused fracturing of the high mountain slopes, creating boulder fields. Over the centuries, erosional forces carried these boulders to lower elevations. Greenbrier's residents used these rocks for fencing in lieu of barbed wire, creating the long rock walls that criss-cross the area today.

== History ==
=== Early history ===
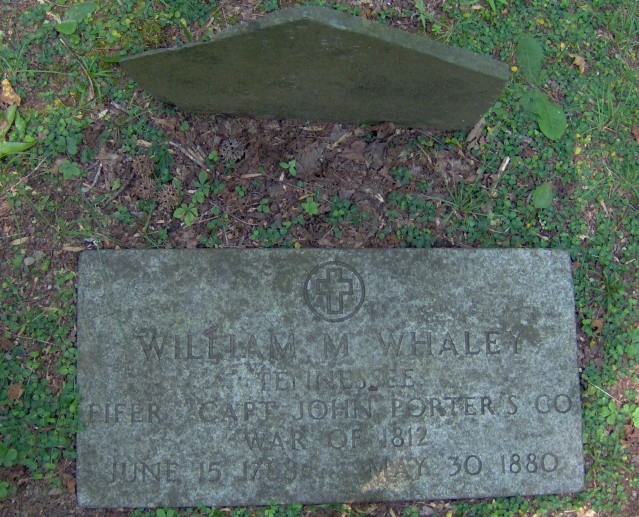
The grave of William Whaley, one of Greenbrier's first Euro-American inhabitants

The name "greenbrier" refers to the thorny vines of the genus Smilax that are common throughout the southern Appalachians. Although it is unknown when the upper Middle Fork valley obtained this name, it was being called "Greenbrier" as early as the 1830s. The name is not uncommon elsewhere in the region.

The Cherokee were the first inhabitants of the Greenbrier area and may have had a seasonal settlement at Porters Flat, near Greenbrier's southern tip. As late as the early 20th century, residents of Greenbrier often referred to Porters Flat as "Indian Nation," which may hearken back to its days as a Cherokee settlement.

Around 1800, William Whaley (1788–1880) and his brother Middleton Whaley (1794–1855) became the first permanent Euro-American settlers in Greenbrier. The Whaleys hailed from Edgefield District, South Carolina, and crossed the Smokies at Dry Sluice Gap (near Charlies Bunion), which is just above Porters Flat. William Whaley settled at the confluence of Porters Creek and the Middle Fork of the Little Pigeon River. Middleton settled further down the valley, near Emert's Cove.

In 1818, the family of John Ownby (1781–1859), a veteran of the War of 1812, settled downstream from the Whaleys. The Whaley and Ownby families spread quickly throughout the valley. In the early 20th century, a map of Greenbrier showed the location of 26 homes—11 were Whaleys and 10 were Ownbys.

=== Later settlers ===
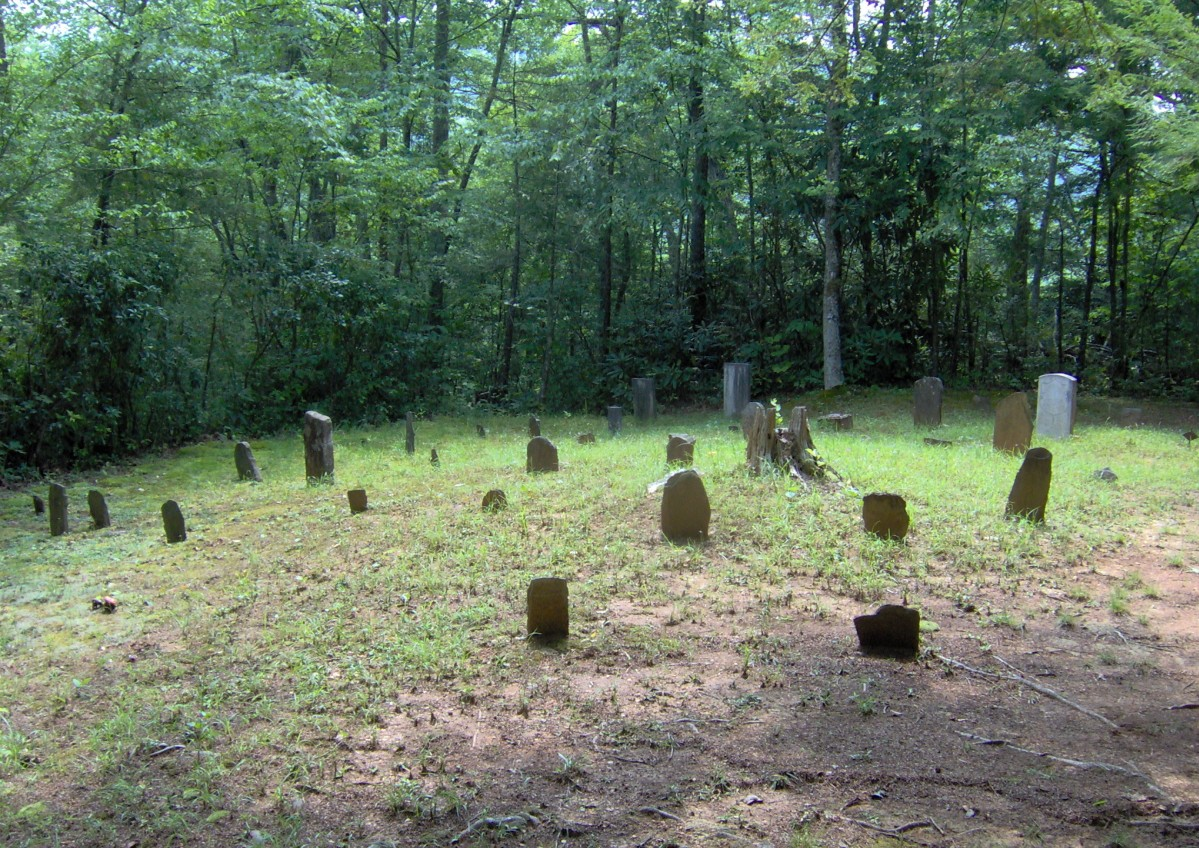
Parton Cemetery in Greenbrier

The upper watershed of the Middle Fork of the Little Pigeon River consists of a series of streams, some flowing down from Grapeyard Ridge to the west and a dozen or so flowing down from Greenbrier Pinnacle to the east. Each of these streams has cut a deep hollow, isolating the bottomlands of each amidst low ridges. Thus, rather than being one large community, Greenbrier consisted of several individual communities located along these streams. Most communities took the name of the stream upon which they were situated. Along with Greenbrier Cove, the most prominent of these small communities included Copeland, Soak Ash, Webb Creek, Ramsey Creek, Noisy Creek, Redwine Creek, and Little Bird Branch, all at the base of Greenbrier Pinnacle, and Laurel Creek (now Rhododendron Creek), located on Grapeyard Ridge.

Charles Rayfield (1825–1891) settled near the junction of Laurel Creek and the Middle Fork sometime before the Civil War. The Grapeyard Ridge Trail now winds through the former homesteads of many of Rayfield's children and grandchildren. David Proffitt (1847–1909), also a veteran of the war, settled further upstream, just below the Whaley lands, sometime around 1870. Around the same time, James Redwine, a circuit rider, settled along the creek that now bears his name.

Benjamin Christenberry Parton (1832–1916), the son of a migrant farm worker, and his wife Margaret arrived in Greenbrier sometime in the 1850s. Parton, who survived a gunshot wound to the head during the Civil War, settled in the narrow flats just above the confluence of Little Bird Branch and the Middle Fork, at the western base of Greenbrier Pinnacle. Parton and many of his descendants are buried in a cemetery on a hill where his cabin once stood, overlooking Little Bird Branch.

=== Life in Greenbrier ===
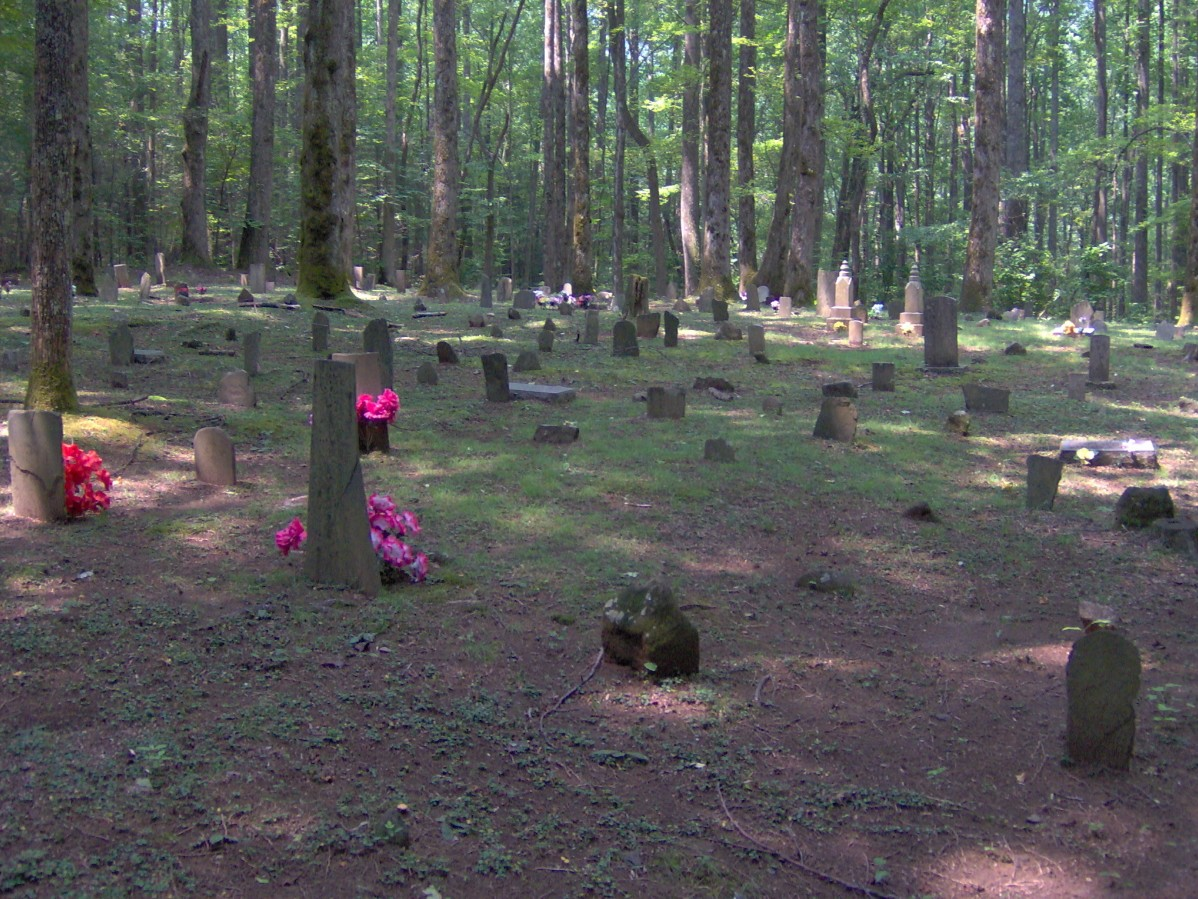
Plemmons Cemetery

Robert Parke of the University of Buffalo visited Greenbrier in the 1920s, and later wrote about his visit in his university's newspaper:

We were slowly penetrating the great range within a few miles of the North Carolina border, passing cornfields so steep that we wondered how they could be cultivated, bouncing past old-time log cabins built of hand-hewn timber, and waving to unbelievably large numbers of silent children who watched amid the barking of their dogs as strangers went by. We stopped by a cabin and inquired of an aged woman who sat leaning back in a homemade hickory chair with her feet on the rail, how far it was to Greenbriar, which had been designated to us as the end of the trail that could be traversed by four wheels.

Like the Sugarlands to the west, Greenbrier was a largely isolated community until the early 20th century. The valley's economy was based on subsistence farming, with most farms ranging in size from 50 to 100 acres (0.40 km^{2}), part of which was woodland. Most families lived in one-room log cabins surrounded by grassless yards and a paling fence, although modern-looking frame houses began to replace log structures when saw mills arrived in the area around 1900. Most farms included a barn, corn crib, smokehouse, springhouse, and a small orchard. Some of the wealthier families owned their own grist mill. As game was plentiful, many farmers supplemented their income by hunting and trapping.

The residents of Greenbrier were largely pro-Union during the Civil War, although most tried to avoid the conflict altogether. A small force led by Confederate commander William Holland Thomas passed through Greenbrier while fleeing to North Carolina after being chased out of Gatlinburg. On the way, they inflicted minor damage to the farms of known Union supporters.

Shortly after the war, Greenbrier resident Perry Shults claimed to have discovered gold and silver at the headwaters of Porters Creek. In 1867, Shults received a charter from the Sevier County Silver, Copper, Lead, and Zinc Company for his find, and Shults began a low-key mining operation in the area. It was later discovered that Shults was producing counterfeit silver coins, and Shults fled west when the Secret Service opened an investigation. The location of Shults' mine (or if it existed at all) is unknown.

Most small communities in the Greenbrier area had at least one general store. Greenbrier residents would typically trade chickens, eggs, and animal furs for clothing, salt, pepper, coal oil, and medicine. As roads improved in the late 19th century, Greenbrier farmers could haul excess crops to Knoxville. These crops were typically corn or potatoes. Others dug ginseng, which was plentiful in the Smokies at the time, while others used their excess corn to make moonshine. Bill Cardwell, who lived in the northern part of Greenbrier in the early 20th century, was said to have regularly sold moonshine to the sheriff of Sevier County.

=== 20th century ===
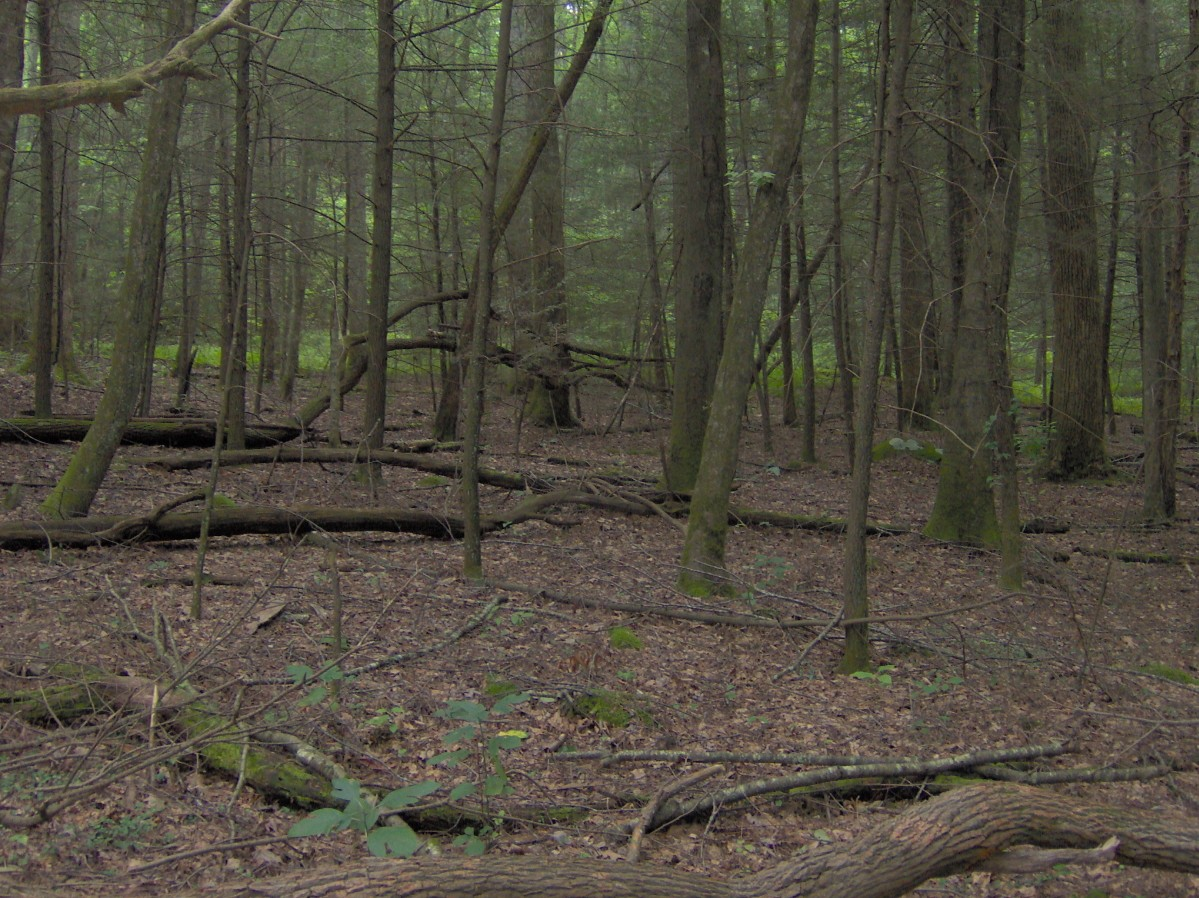
Porters Flat, also known as Indian Nation

In the early 20th century, Greenbrier had a population of approximately 500. Scattered about the valley were three general stores, two churches, a school, a hotel, three blacksmith shops, and five grist mills. Roads were collectively maintained by males 21 and over, working six days every year. The two main religious denominations were the Primitive Baptists and Missionary Baptists.

In the late 19th century, innovations in the logging industry, specifically the band saw, led to a rapid deforestation of the woodland along the Ohio Valley and Mississippi Delta. As demand for timber increased, lumber companies turned to the dense, mature forests of Appalachia. Saw mills began to spring up around the Smokies, with major logging operations taking place above Elkmont and the Oconaluftee watershed. Greenbrier residents David Proffitt and Pinkney Whaley erected a saw mill near Porters Flat and by 1916 had helped log some 738 acres (2.99 km^{2}) of the Porters Creek watershed.

Around this time, the writings of authors such as Horace Kephart began to draw tourists to the Smokies. Greenbrier residents had always offered lodging to the various loggers, surveyors, and fur trappers who visited the valley, but no major hotel existed that could rival the likes of Andy Huff's Mountain View Hotel in Gatlinburg. In 1925 Kimsey and James West Whaley bought the old Greenbrier schoolhouse (which had burned) and remodeled it as a lodge. Hotel LeConte, as it was known, was opened that same year. Located near the junction of Porters Creek and the Middle Fork, the hotel operated until 1935, with rates of $1.75/day. Robert Parke recalled Hotel LeConte as:

... the largest building we had seen in the mountains. Some enterprising mountaineer, foreseeing the time the mountain country would bow to the relentless inroads of civilization, had constructed out of rough-sawed boards a two-story building with several rooms in which we found he had accommodated an occasional surveyor and such hardy individuals as would penetrate the mountains.

The hotel made a convenient jumping point for excursions to nearby Mount Le Conte and Mount Guyot. Its foundation remains today, just off Ramsey Prong Road.

=== National park ===
Tourism and heavy logging led to increased demands from conservationists to protect the Great Smoky Mountains. A national forest was established by the Weeks Act of 1911, and in 1926 the Great Smoky Mountains Park Commission began buying up land for a national park. While the residents of Greenbrier were displaced, many simply moved to the other side of the park boundary to Emert's Cove and the Webb Mountain area. Two former Greenbrier residents, Conley Huskey and Glenn Cardwell, would eventually serve as the mayor of Pittman Center, just two miles (3 km) north of Greenbrier.

Many members of the Parton family relocated to Locust Ridge, a hilly area between Pittman Center and Richardson Cove. The family's most famous member, entertainer Dolly Parton, is the great-great-granddaughter of Benjamin Christenberry Parton. Descendants of other Greenbrier residents now operate a number of varying businesses along U.S. Route 321 between Gatlinburg and Cosby. One Whaley family would eventually be displaced three times by eminent domain—once when the NPS purchased their farm in Greenbrier, then again when the Tennessee Valley Authority purchased their land for the construction of Norris Dam, and a third time when their land was purchased in Oak Ridge for the Manhattan Project.

Many former residents of Greenbrier went on to become pastors, reflecting Greenbrier residents' deeply held religious beliefs. Members of Greenbrier's Primitive Baptist community continued to meet as late as the 1980s. In 1933, the Civilian Conservation Corps established Camp David Chapman at near the confluence of Rhododendron Creek and the Middle Fork. This camp, which constructed most of the roads and trails in the Greenbrier area, provided valuable employment to locals during the Great Depression.

== Greenbrier today ==
Greenbrier is now home to a ranger station and a general recreation area within the national park. A partially paved road connects U.S. Route 321 to the Porters Creek and Ramsey Prong areas.

=== Trails ===
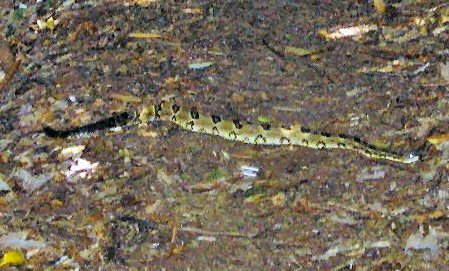
Timber rattlesnake on the Old Settlers Trail

Several hiking trails originate in the Greenbrier area:

The Grapeyard Ridge Trail follows Rhododendron Creek over the south slope of Brushy Mountain to the Jim Bales Place at Roaring Fork. The trail passes the remains of the CCC Camp David Chapman, several Rayfield homesites, and the 1920s-era remains of a wrecked Nichols and Shepard self-propelled, steam-powered engine (known as a traction engine). The wrecked engine rests in the bed of Injun Creek.

The Ramsey Cascades Trail follows Ramsey Prong four miles (6 km) up the slope of Mount Guyot to Ramsey Cascades, a 65-foot (20 m) waterfall nestled between Guyot Spur and Greenbrier Pinnacle. For decades, hikers have used Ramsey Prong to bushwhack to the Appalachian Trail, just below Guyot's summit. A side trail at the end of Ramsey Prong Road leads to the summit of Greenbrier Pinnacle.

The Porters Creek Trail follows Porters Creek to Porters Flat, where it passes the Messer Barn site before ascending to a backcountry campsite.

The Old Settlers Trail, one of the longest trails in the park, connects Greenbrier to the Cosby area. The trail was envisioned as a lower-elevation alternative to the Appalachian Trail and was built by connecting the old roads in the various communities that existed between Greenbrier and Maddron Bald. The trail passes dozens of rock walls and chimney falls, as well as the Tyson McCarter Place. Spur trails connect with several cemeteries, including Parton Cemetery and Lindsey Cemetery. Timber rattlesnakes are not an uncommon sight on the trail, as large numbers have long been known to live on the slopes of Greenbrier Pinnacle.

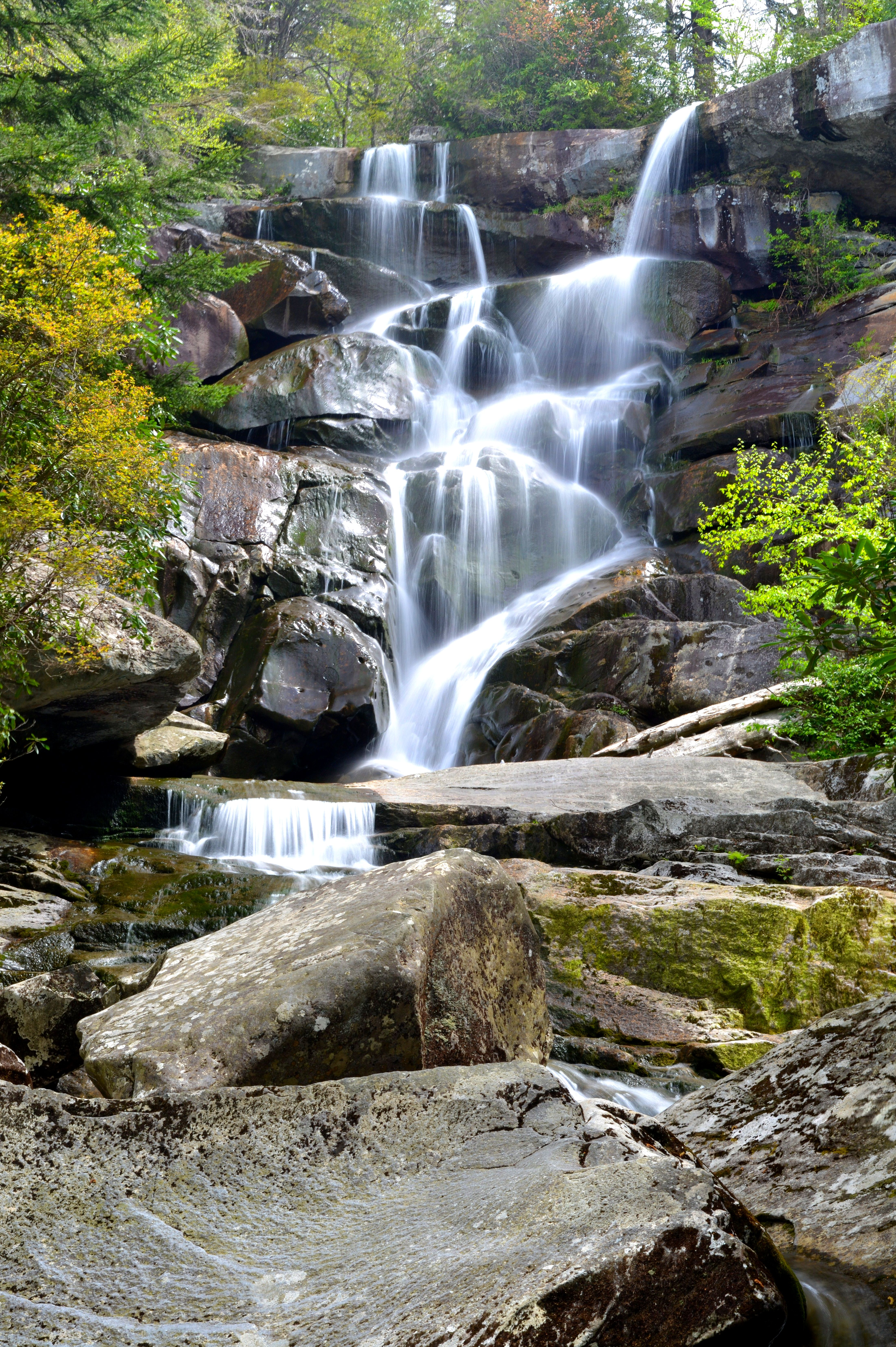
Ramsey Cascades

== Historical sites ==
The Greenbrier area contains one of the park's largest concentrations of chimney falls and rock walls, which mark the sites of former homesteads. While most structures were removed in the 1930s, a few are preserved by the park service as representative of pioneer life in Appalachia. The John Messer Barn in Greenbrier Cove and the Tyson McCarter Place along Webb Creek are listed on the National Register of Historic Places, and the Smoky Mountain Hiking Club Cabin has been deemed eligible for the National Register by the Tennessee Historical Commission. Plemmons Cemetery, located near the junction of Middle Fork and Porters Creek, is one of the largest cemeteries found within park boundaries.

=== John Messer Barn ===
Located along the Porters Creek Trail, the John Messer Barn was constructed in 1875 by Pinkney Whaley. The only remaining structure of the pre-park community of Greenbrier Cove, it was added to the National Register in 1976. The Messer Barn is a type of double-cantilever barn unique to East Tennessee and rarely found outside its immediate vicinity.

=== Smoky Mountains Hiking Club Cabin ===
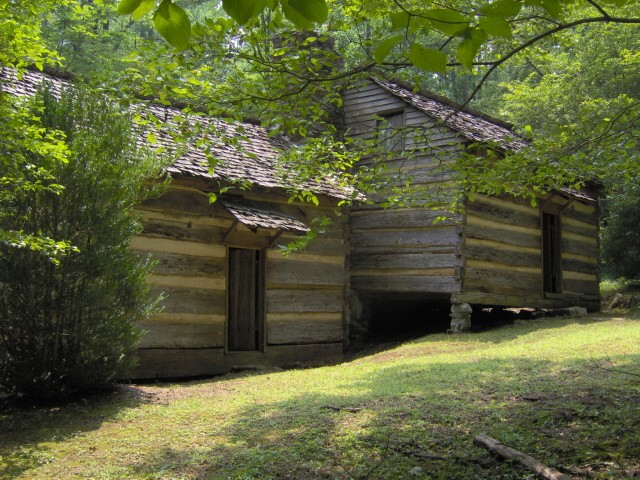
The Smoky Mountain Hiking Club Cabin

The Smoky Mountains Hiking Club Cabin, located next to the Messer Barn on the Porters Creek Trail, is a dog-trot cabin constructed by members of the SMHC between 1934 and 1936, one of the few non-NPS structures built within the park's boundaries during the 1930s. In 1933, the club's members (among them park promoters David Chapman, Harvey Broome, and Carlos Campbell) met with NPS director Arno Cammerer at the Andrew Johnson Hotel in Knoxville and convinced him to grant them a special-use permit to build the cabin.

Club member and prominent Knoxville architect Charles I. Barber, whose firm Barber & McMurry designed the park's headquarters and several notable buildings on the Arrowmont campus in Gatlinburg, designed the cabin and oversaw its construction using the labor of club members. The club used the logs from dismantled Whaley structures including the home cabin and barn of James A. & Phoebe Irene Whaley Whaley, and constructed the cabin around an existing chimney fall. The club leased the cabin from the park service until 1981.

=== Tyson McCarter Place ===
The Tyson McCarter Place, located near where the Old Settlers Trail crosses Webb Creek just off U.S. Route 321, consists of a barn, corn crib, smokehouse, and springhouse constructed around 1876. Jacob Tyson McCarter purchased the farm around 1900, and in subsequent decades he became a prominent member of the Webb Creek community. The area was placed on the National Register of Historic Places in 1976.

=== Baxter Cabin ===
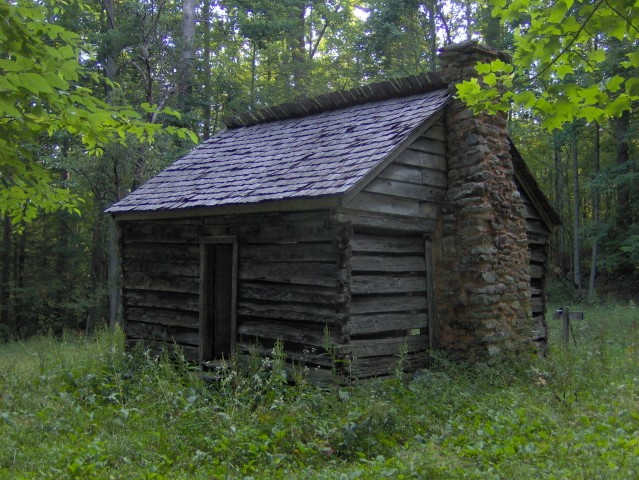
Baxter Cabin

The Baxter/Jenkins Cabin, located near the junction of the Old Settlers Trail and the Maddron Bald Trail, was built by Willis Baxter and his son, William, in 1889. The cabin was originally a wedding gift to William and was passed on to Willis' second son, Alex, when William's wife inherited property in Cosby. Chandler Jenkins was a later owner. The farm originally included two cabins, a barn, corn crib, smokehouse, hog pen, chicken house, and blacksmith shop, but this cabin and the chicken house are all that remain. In the 1950s, the chicken house was moved to the Mountain Farm Museum at Oconaluftee.

The cabin is a single-pen cabin built of chestnut logs, and measures 16 feet (4.9 m) by 18 feet (5.5 m). The interior included a puncheon-log floor and a loft, and a "tater hole" (a kind of small root cellar) near the fireplace. The front and back walls both have doors, although the cabin has no windows. An 8-foot (2.4 m) by 18-foot (5.5 m) lean-to kitchen was once attached to the west wall but has been removed. The cabin's chimney is made of stone and mud.
