= Oconaluftee Baptist Church =

Historic church in North Carolina, United States

- U.S. National Register of Historic Places
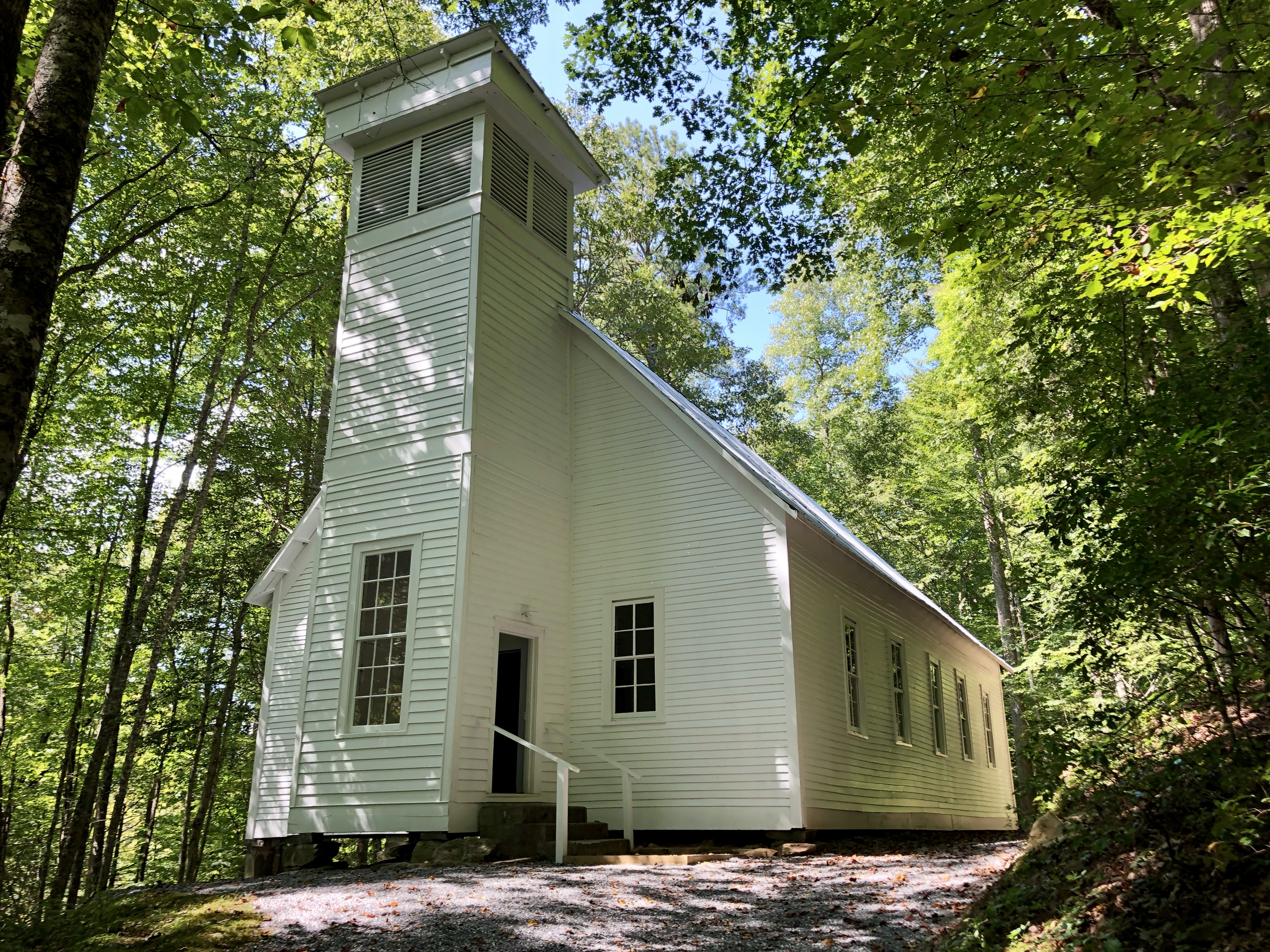
- Oconaluftee (Smokemont) Baptist Church

- Location within North Carolina Location within the United States
- Location: 6 miles north of Cherokee on U.S. Route 441 in Great Smoky Mountains National Park, Cherokee, North Carolina
- Coordinates: 35°33′13″N 83°18′31″W
- Area: 3 acres (1.2 ha)
- Built: 1912
- NRHP reference No.: 76000163
- Added to NRHP: January 1, 1976

The Oconaluftee Baptist Church, also known as the Smokemont Baptist Church, is a historic Baptist church in Great Smoky Mountains National Park, near Cherokee, North Carolina. It is located off United States Route 441, overlooking the Smokemont Campground of the park. It is a basically rectangular wood-frame structure, 30 feet (9.1 m) wide and 50 feet (15 m) deep. The church's tower projects from the front of this main block, and rises about 10 feet (3.0 m) above the level of the gable roof; it does not have a spire or steeple, and its uppermost section is a louvered belfry. This church building was built in 1912 for a congregation organized in 1836. The congregation's records (which extend only to 1895) form a valuable documentation of local history. The church remained in active use until the area was made part of the national park in 1935, and has seen occasional use since then.

The church was listed on the National Register of Historic Places in 1976.

The church was the site of a fatal stabbing on March 29, 2015, which occurred inside the building.

== See also ==
- National Register of Historic Places listings in Swain County, North Carolina
- National Register of Historic Places listings in Great Smoky Mountains National Park
