= Little Greenbrier (Great Smoky Mountains) =

Historic community in Tennessee, USA

Coordinates: 35.6831°N 83.6386°W

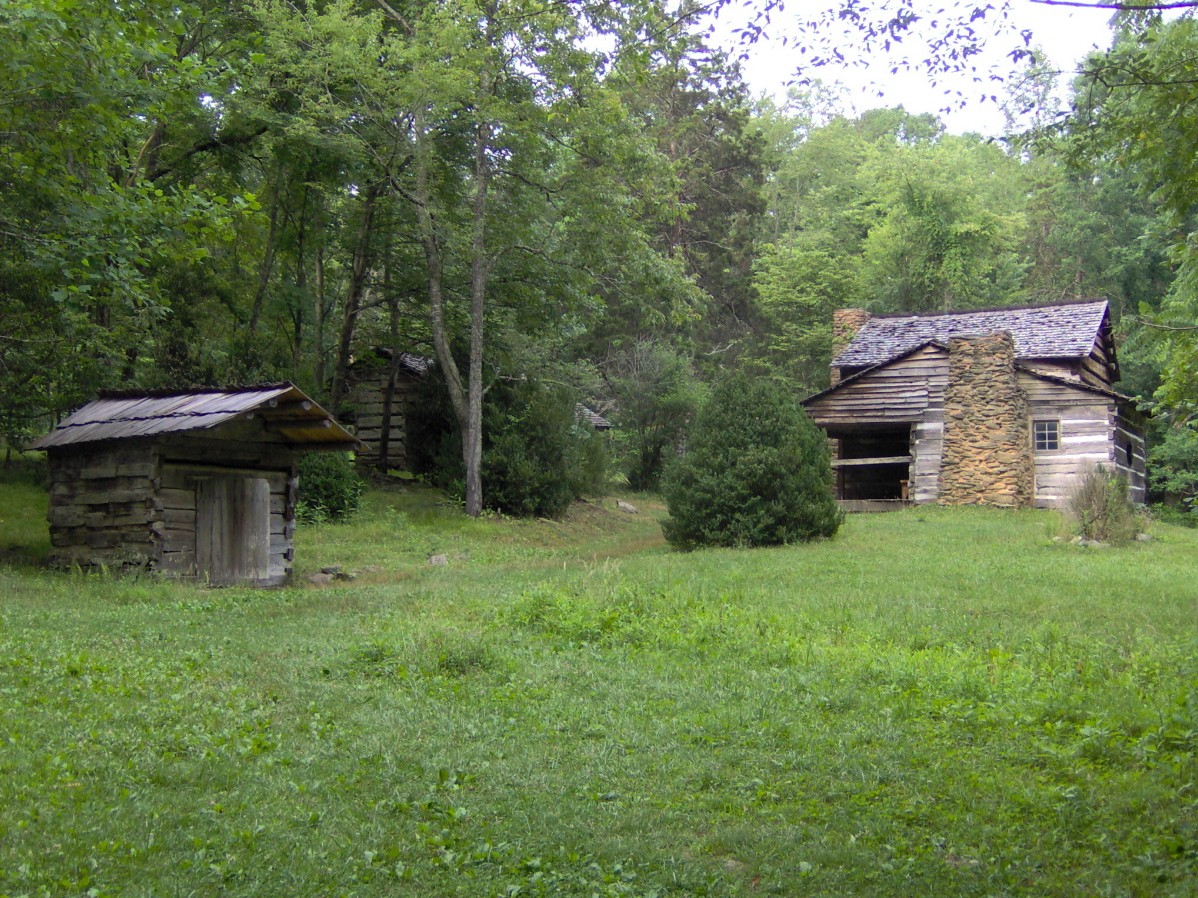
The King-Walker Place at Little Greenbrier

Little Greenbrier is the name of a former Appalachian community that is now an historical area in the Great Smoky Mountains of East Tennessee. The community was situated in a valley rising from Metcalf Bottoms along Little River to the upper slopes of Cove Mountain, in the northeastern section of the Great Smoky Mountains National Park. Little Greenbrier was once known simply as "Greenbrier," but "Little" was added to distinguish it from the larger Greenbrier located between Mount Le Conte and Mount Guyot to the east.

Little Greenbrier is home to the Walker Cabin and the Little Greenbrier Schoolhouse—both on the National Register of Historic Places.

== Geography ==
Little Greenbrier is located in a gradually-ascending valley on the southwestern flank of Cove Mountain. This mountain links up with the eastern flank of Roundtop Mountain to form a long wall-like ridge that provides a natural boundary between Wears Valley and the national park (the park boundary roughly follows the ridge crest). Little Brier Branch, its source near the top of Cove Mountain, flows southward and drains Little Greenbrier before emptying into Little River at Metcalf Bottoms.

Lyon Springs Road, which connects Wears Valley Gap Road (U.S. Route 321) with Little River Gorge Road, passes near Little Greenbrier. A short gravel road leads from Lyon Springs Road to the Little Greenbrier Schoolhouse. The rest of Little Greenbrier can be reached via short hiking trails, namely the Little Brier Gap Trail from Metcalf Bottoms, or the much longer Cove Mountain Trail from the Sugarlands Visitor Center several miles to the east.

== History ==
The earliest documented settlers in Little Greenbrier were Alexander McKenzie and Arthur "Brice" McFalls. McKenzie and McFalls, who had been neighbors in North Carolina, arrived in the 1830s. McFalls is believed to have built a cabin in the 1840s that was reassembled by later arrival John Walker as the "kitchen" half of the Walker Cabin.

Around the time of the Civil War, William and Riley Metcalf, two brothers of Cherokee descent, moved their families to the flats around the confluence of Little Brier Branch and Little River that now bears their name. During the construction of Little River Road in the 1920s, members of the Metcalf family supplied drinking water to road construction crews, and in appreciation the picnic area later established in the area by the National Park Service was named for the Metcalfs.

=== Little Greenbrier School ===
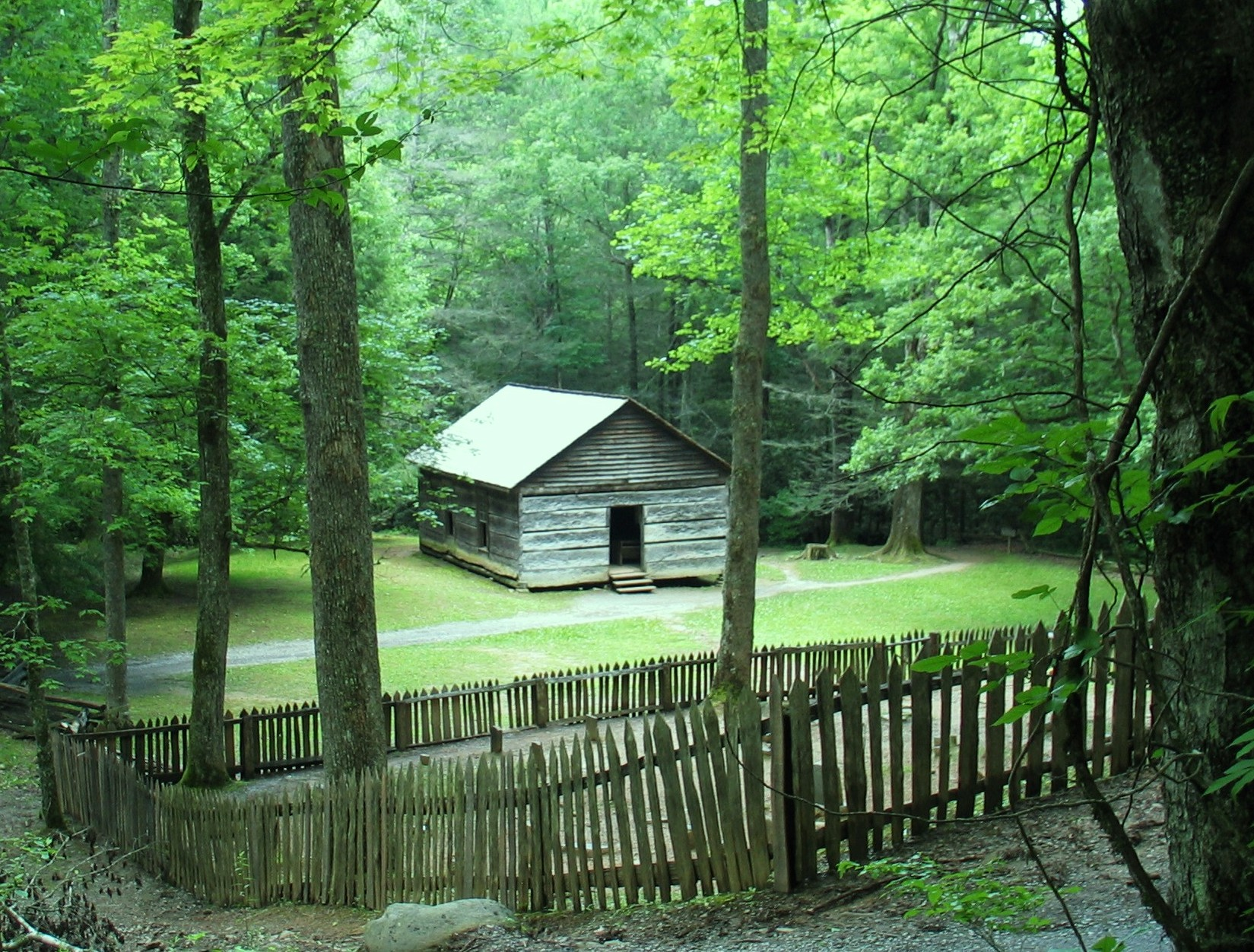
Little Greenbrier schoolhouse, with Greenbrier cemetery in the foreground

Built in 1882, the Little Greenbrier School functioned as the community school until 1936. Over its 54-year history, it was used as a schoolhouse under the supervision of nearly 50 teachers, and it was the house of worship for a Primitive Baptist church. It is located at the center of what was once Little Greenbrier.

=== Walker Sisters Place ===
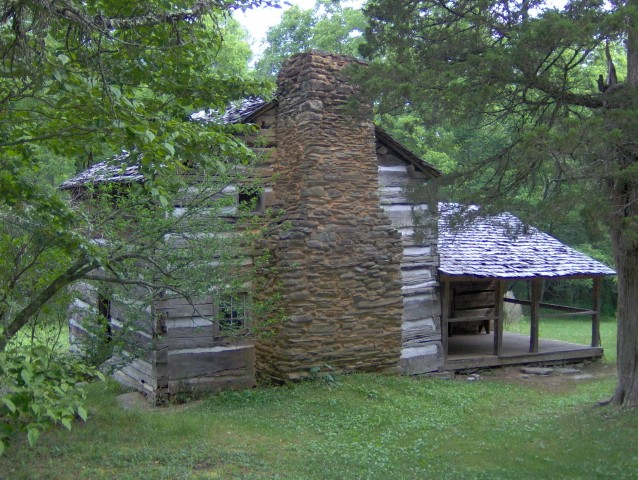
The Walker Cabin

The Walker Sisters Place (sometimes referred to as the King-Walker Place after its primary builders) was the home of five sisters who refused to sell their 166-acre (0.7 km^{2}) plot to the national park and maintained their traditional mountain life into the 1950s. In 1946, the Saturday Evening Post published an article on the Walker sisters that drew a flood of tourists to the area. The "kitchen" part of the cabin was built in the 1840s by early settler Brice McFalls. The larger cabin was built in the 1850s by Wiley King. His sons completed the chimney, and his son-in-law, John N. Walker, built the porch and merged the larger cabin with the smaller McFalls cabin. By 1921, the cabin and farm had passed to five of Walker's daughters—Margaret Jane, Polly, Louisa, Hettie, and Martha—who had lived on the land their entire lives. The National Park Service assumed control of the land when the last of the Walkers died in 1964.

In the 1930s, the commission responsible for buying land for the Great Smoky Mountains National Park unsuccessfully attempted to persuade the Walker sisters to sell the homestead. Fearing bad publicity, the commission balked at forcing the Walkers out via condemnation suits. The Walker sisters finally sold the farm in 1941 in exchange for a lifetime lease. A local legend claims the sisters were paid a visit by President Franklin Roosevelt who convinced them to sell the land (Roosevelt was in the area to dedicate the national park in 1940, but there is no known record of a visit to the Walker place).

=== Cemetery ===
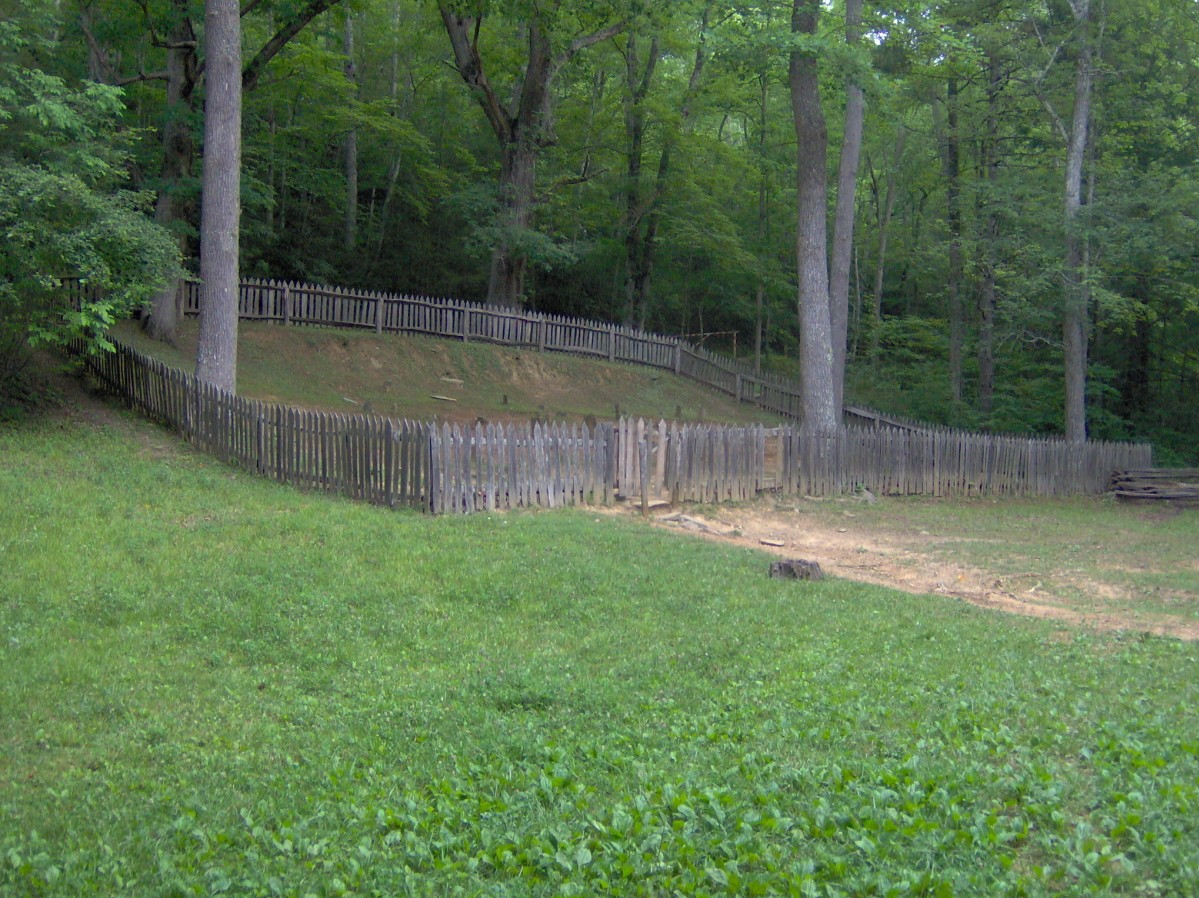
The Greenbrier Cemetery at Little Greenbrier

Greenbrier Cemetery is located next to the Little Greenbrier Schoolhouse. In many ways, the cemetery is representative of typical Appalachian cemeteries. Constructed on a slope, nearly half of the graves are those of children.
