= Noah Ogle Place =

Historic house in Tennessee, United States

- Bud Ogle Farm
- U.S. National Register of Historic Places
- U.S. Historic district
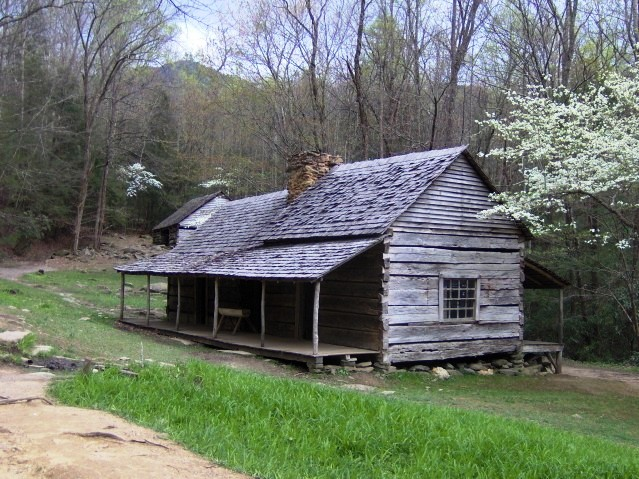
- Noah "Bud" Ogle cabin

- Location within Tennessee Location within the United States
- Location: 3 mi. SE of Gatlinburg
- Nearest city: Gatlinburg, Tennessee
- Coordinates: 35°40′57″N 83°29′24″W
- NRHP reference No.: 77000158
- Added to NRHP: November 23, 1977

The Noah "Bud" Ogle Place was a homestead located in the Great Smoky Mountains of Sevier County, in the U.S. state of Tennessee. The homestead presently consists of a cabin, barn, and tub mill built by mountain farmer Noah "Bud" Ogle (1863–1913) in the late 19th century. In 1977, the homestead was added to the National Register of Historic Places and is currently maintained by the Great Smoky Mountains National Park.

The surviving structures at the Noah Ogle Place are characteristic of a typical 19th-century Southern Appalachian mountain farm. Ogle's cabin is a type known as a "saddlebag" cabin (two single-pen cabins joined by a common chimney), which was a relatively rare design in the region. Ogle's barn is an excellent example of a four-pen barn, a design once common in the area, although this barn is the last remaining four-pen barn in the park. Ogle's tub mill is the park's last surviving operational tub mill and one of the few operational tub mills in the region. A later owner of the Ogle farm renamed the farm "Junglebrook," and the farm is thus sometimes referred to as the "Junglebrook Historic District."

== Location ==
The Noah Ogle Place is situated near LeConte Creek (formerly known as Mill Creek) in the upper drainage of the West Fork of the Little Pigeon River. Gatlinburg lies opposite the park boundary to the north, Roaring Fork lies opposite the hills to the east, the Sugarlands lies opposite the hills to the west, and Mount Le Conte rises to the south. Cherokee Orchard Road (still occasionally referred to as Airport Road) connects the Noah Ogle Place to U.S. Route 441 in downtown Gatlinburg to the north and to the Roaring Fork Motor Nature Trail to the south. The site's tub mill is situated on the banks of LeConte Creek, approximately 0.5 miles (0.80 km) from the cabin and barn.

== History ==
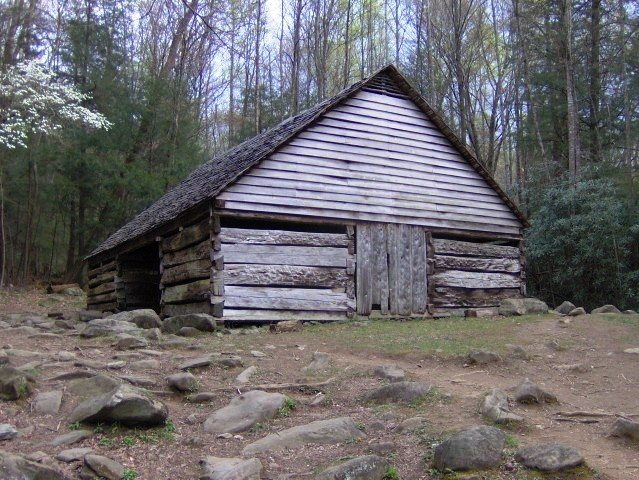
Ogle barn

Noah Ogle's great-grandparents, William Ogle (1756–1803) and his wife Martha Huskey (1756–1826), were the first Euro-American settlers in the Gatlinburg area, arriving in the early 19th century (their cabin still stands on the Arrowmont School campus in downtown Gatlinburg). The Ogles' descendants quickly spread out into the adjacent river and creek valleys. Noah Ogle's farm originally consisted of 400 acres (160 ha), although by the early 20th century he had subdivided his land among his children, and retained only 150 acres (61 ha). These last 150 acres (0.61 km^{2}) comprise the bulk of the Bud Ogle Farm historic district.

Ogle's cabin and outbuildings were built in the late 1880s and early 1890s. The land was poor and rocky (the National Park Service later claimed it was "unsuitable" for farming), and Ogle mostly grew corn. The land did include a sizeable apple orchard which grew multiple types of apples. Ogle's relatives were allowed free use of his tub mill, while others were charged a small percentage of meal. Excess corn and apples were shipped to markets in Knoxville. Ogle's wife, Lucinda Bradley Ogle, was a local midwife.

Along with the surviving structures and typical mountain farm outbuildings, Ogle's farm included a so-called "weaner cabin." A weaner cabin was typically a small cabin near the main house where the farmer's children could live for a brief period after marrying. Several of Ogle's sons lived in the Ogle weaner cabin after their respective marriages. The weaner cabin is no longer standing, although a pile of rubble remains from its foundation.

In the 1920s, several investors established a 796-acre (322 ha) commercial apple orchard and ornamental nursery known as "Cherokee Orchard" just south of the Ogle homestead. When the Tennessee Park Commission began buying up property for the creation of the national park in the late 1920s, the owners of Cherokee Orchard threatened to fight a major appropriations for bill for the park's funding if their land was condemned. The orchard's owners dropped their opposition in 1931 in exchange for a long lease on the property.

== Historic structures ==
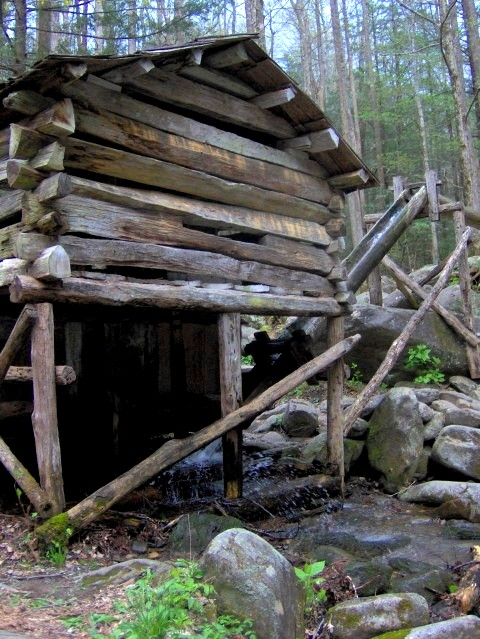
Ogle tub mill, viewed from LeConte Creek

=== Noah Ogle cabin ===
The Noah Ogle cabin consists of two cabins sharing a single chimney, known as a "saddlebag" cabin. The cabins were built approximately five years apart, the second cabin being added as Ogle's family grew. Both cabins measure 18 feet (5.5 m) by 20 feet (6.1 m), and each consists of one story and a loft. The cabin's walls consist of hewn logs connected by half-dovetail notches, with six doors (one on the front and back wall of each cabin, and two next to the chimney to allow quick passage between the two buildings). Each cabin has a split-oak shingled roof, a sawn board floor, and hearths made of rubble. The cabin's windows were initially shuttered, but eventually replaced with glass. One cabin has a small window near the floor that allowed chickens to enter to escape predators. A covered porch spans both the front and back walls of both cabins.

=== Ogle barn ===
The Ogle barn is the last remaining four-pen barn in the park. It consists of four 11-square-foot (1.0 m^{2}) pens, each one story with a loft, covered by a split-shingled roof. Like the cabin, the barn's walls are constructed of hewn logs connected by half-dovetail notches. The park service made numerous repairs to the barn in the 1960s.

=== Tub mill ===
Ogle's tub mill is the last of at least 13 tub mills once located along LeConte Creek. The millhouse is an 11-foot (3.4 m) by 11-foot (3.4 m) building resting on mudsills and round log supports above LeConte Creek, about a half-mile from Ogle cabin and barn. The walls consist of logs connected with saddle notches, and the floor consists of hewn puncheon logs. A vertical shaft beneath the millhouse connects the grindstones with a "tub wheel" turbine. An 80-foot (24 m) hollowed-log flume diverts water from the creek to the turbine. The mill was restored to its operational condition in the 1960s.

== See also ==
- Tyson McCarter Place
- Walker Sisters Place
