= Walker Sisters Place =

Historic house in Tennessee, United States

- King-Walker Place
- U.S. National Register of Historic Places
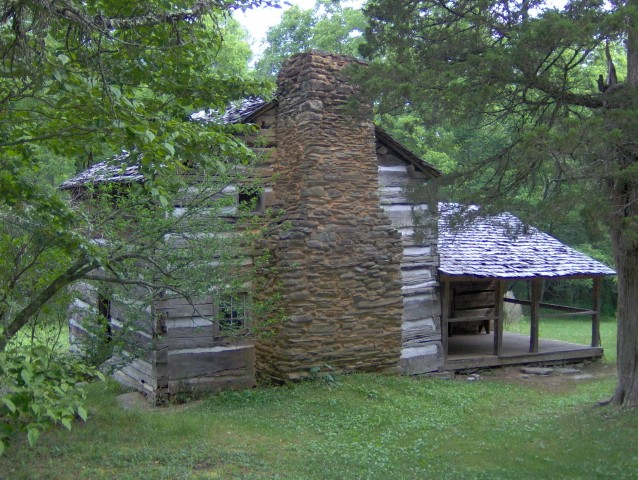
- Walker Cabin
- Location: W of Gatlinburg off State Route 73 in Great Smoky Mountains National Park
- Coordinates: 35°41′38.08″N 83°37′48.494″W
- Area: Less than 10 acres (4.0 ha)
- Built: 1840s, 1850s, 1870s
- NRHP reference No.: 76000169
- Added to NRHP: March 16, 1976

The Walker Sisters Place was a homestead in the Great Smoky Mountains of Sevier County, in the U.S. state of Tennessee. The surviving structures—which include the cabin, springhouse, and corn crib—were once part of a farm that belonged to the Walker sisters—five sisters who became local legends because of their adherence to traditional ways of living. The sisters inherited the farm from their father, and after the Great Smoky Mountains National Park was formed in the 1930s, they obtained a lifetime lease. The National Park Service gained control of the property in 1964 when the last Walker sister died. The surviving structures were placed on the National Register of Historic Places in 1976.

Former Great Smoky Mountains National Park historian Paul Gordon writes, "of all the people who once lived in what is now Great Smoky Mountains National Park, none exhibited better the character of the mountain people than the Walker family." While part of the Walker Cabin was built in the 1840s (this section later became the cabin's kitchen) by an early Little Greenbrier settler, the present cabin is mostly the work of Wiley King (1800–1859) and John Walker (1841–1921), the latter being the father of the Walker sisters. Walker built the farm's corn crib in the 1870s, and in 1882 he helped build the nearby Little Greenbrier School. An article about the Walker Sisters appeared in the April 27, 1947 edition of the Saturday Evening Post.

== Location ==
The Walker Sisters Place is located at the upper (northern) end of Little Greenbrier, a narrow valley carved into the southwestern slope of Cove Mountain by Little Brier Branch. The flat in which the cabin and outbuildings are situated has since become known as Five Sisters Cove. Cove Mountain rises to the north and east, and the southwestern flank of Cove Mountain, known as Little Mountain, rises to the west. The Little Brier Gap Trail connects the area to the Metcalf Bottoms picnic area along Little River Gorge Road to the south, and a gravel maintenance road connects the area to Wears Valley Gap Road (which accesses Wears Valley) to the west. The Cove Mountain Trail connects the area with the Sugarlands Visitor Center opposite Cove Mountain to the east.

== History ==
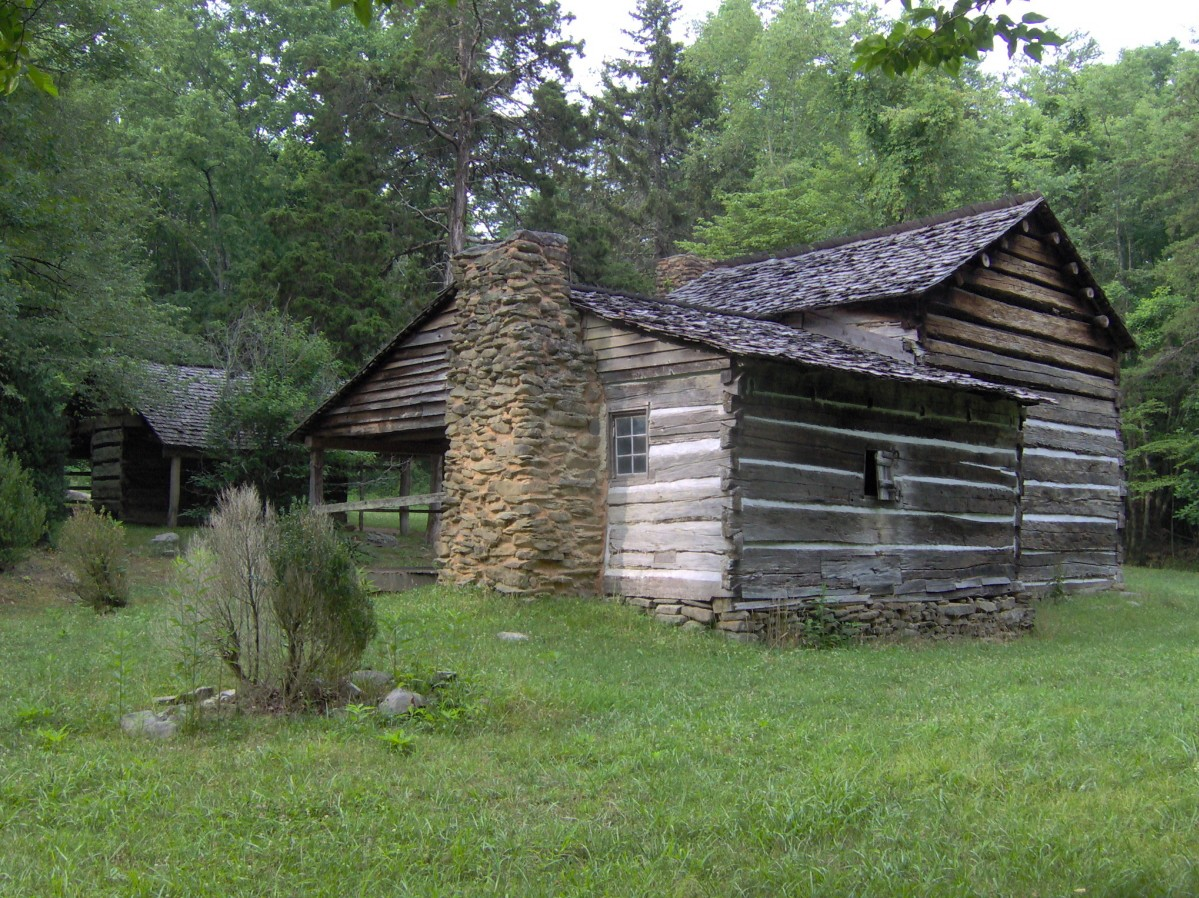
Walker Cabin, showing the older section and porch in the foreground, and the newer section rising behind it

In the 1820s, much of what is now Little Greenbrier was purchased by John Renfro, although little is known of Renfro. Early Little Greenbrier settler Arthur "Brice" McFalls, who moved to the area from South Carolina, bought what is now the Walker Place from Renfro in 1838. McFalls probably built the smaller half of the Walker Cabin shortly thereafter. Wiley King (1800–1859) purchased the land in 1853, and built all but the chimney of the larger, 2-story half of the Walker Cabin. His sons completed the chimney shortly after his death.

In 1866, King's daughter, Margaret (1846–1909), married John Walker, a Union Army veteran who had just returned from the Civil War. The Walkers moved into the cabin in 1870 and in subsequent years dismantled the McFalls cabin and reassembled it as a wing of the Walker Cabin for use as a kitchen. Walker also built the porch during this period. In 1909, Walker deeded the land to six of his daughters— Margaret (1870–1962), Martha (1877–1951), Nancy (1880–1931), Louisa (1882–1964), Polly, and Hettie (1889–1947)— and his youngest son, Giles (Walker's other four children had married and moved away). Upon John's death in 1921, Giles deeded his share of the land to his sisters. With Nancy dying only 10 years later, Margaret, Martha, Louisa, Polly and Hettie became the five Walker sisters continuing homesteading and later associated with Five Sisters Cove.

While the mountain communities in the surrounding valleys began to modernize to some extent after World War I, the Walker sisters clung to the old way of life, which emphasized self-reliance. The sisters raised sheep and grew corn and cotton, sometimes plowing their own fields. They made their own clothes from the wool and cotton they had raised and became well known for their Christmas feasts, which consisted almost wholly of food they had grown themselves. In 1933, the Great Smoky Mountains Park Commission, charged with purchasing property for the creation of the national park, unsuccessfully tried to persuade the Walker sisters to sell their land. Fearing bad publicity, the commission refused to initiate a condemnation suit. The Walker sisters finally agreed to sell the property in 1940 in exchange for a lifetime lease.

Once the Park was established, the sisters could no longer do many of the activities that made up their traditional way of life such as grazing livestock, hunting, fishing, or wood cutting. They began accepting Park visitors and selling handmade products from the Parks's establishment in 1940 until 1951 when only two sisters remained, Margaret and Louisa, who wrote a letter to the Park service asking for the visitors welcome sign with information about the Walker cabin to be taken down. The two remaining sisters maintained their homestead until Margaret's death in 1962 at 92 years old. Louisa stayed at her family home until her death two years later in 1964.

== Historical structures ==
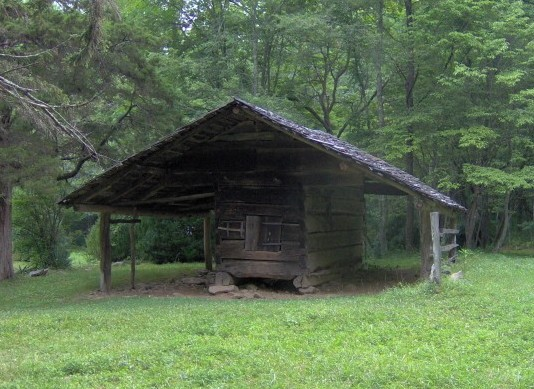
Corn crib

The Walker Cabin is an L-shaped log cabin, with a porch filling out the gap in the "L" to make a rectangle. The cabin's kitchen consists of one story measuring 18 feet (5.5 m) by 27 feet (8.2 m), and has a door leading to the porch and a door to the larger half of the cabin. The larger cabin consists of one-and-one-half stories measuring 20 feet (6.1 m) by 22 feet (6.7 m). Both cabins are built of hewn logs with half-dovetail notching and contain sawn board floors. Both have gabled, shingled roofs, and both have stone-and-mud chimneys.

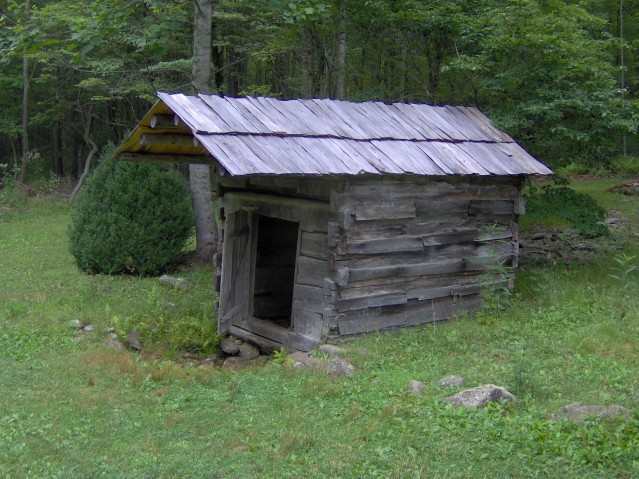
Springhouse

The Walker corn crib is a 25-foot (7.6 m) by 20-foot (6.1 m) structure built of hewn logs with half-dovetail notching. The structure's large gabled roof overhangs both sides of the crib considerably, creating ample shed space. The interior of the crib has a puncheon floor and is accessed by a door at the west end. These structures were sometimes called "plunder sheds," as farmers used them to store miscellaneous items such as barbed wire, brooms, firewood, and tools.

The Walker springhouse is an 8-foot (2.4 m) by 10-foot (3.0 m) structure built of hewn logs with half-dovetail notching. The gabled roof is supported by poles, and a board and batten door allows access. The interior contains a stone trough through which a spring once flowed, cooling the interior. The interior walls contain small storage shelves. Before the advent of refrigerators, springhouses were used to keep perishable items cool.

== See also ==
- Tyson McCarter Place
- Noah Ogle Place
