= Tyson McCarter Place =

Historic house in Tennessee, United States

- U.S. National Register of Historic Places
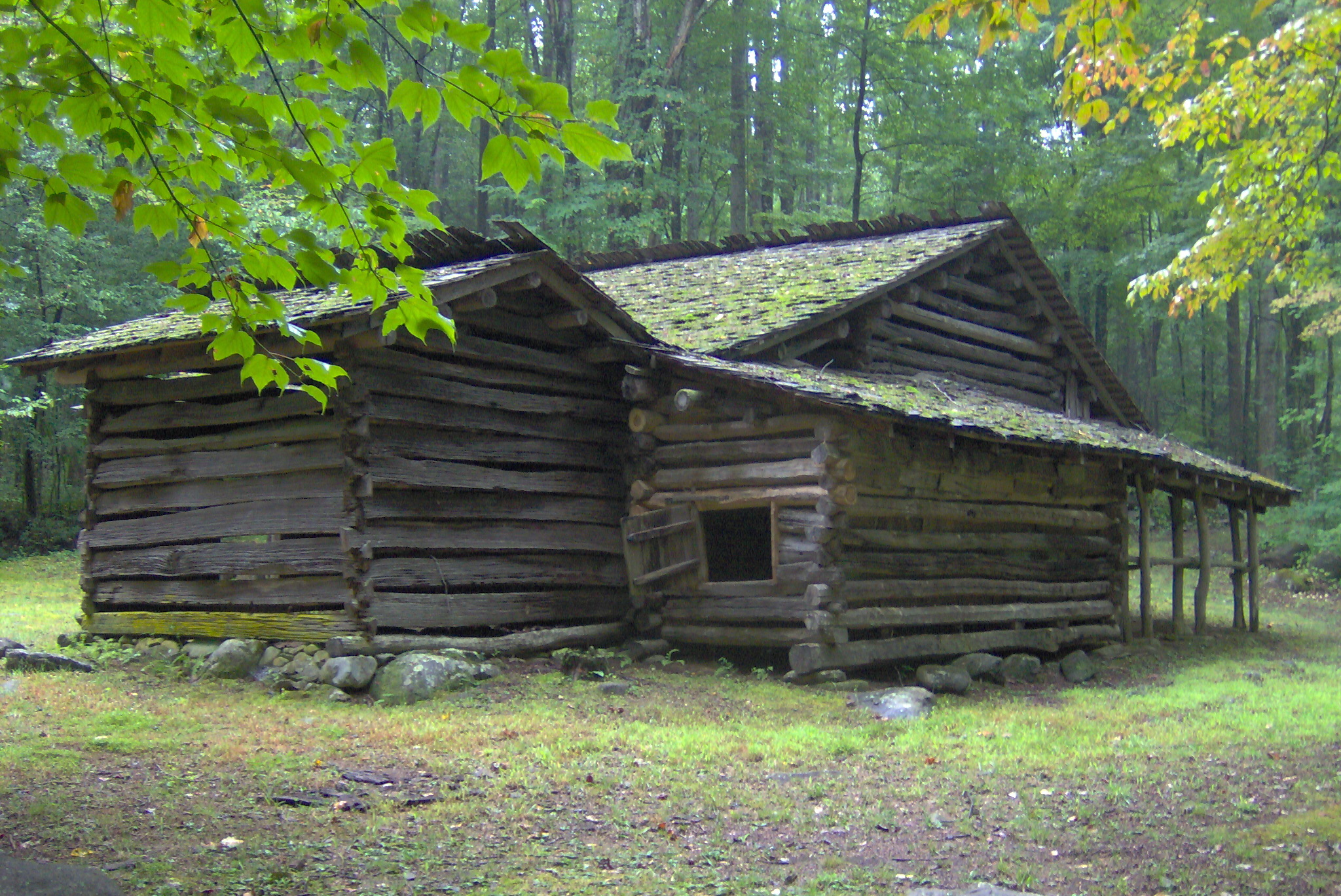
- McCarter smokehouse (left), corn crib (right), and barn (rising beyond)
- Location: 10 miles east of Gatlinburg on State Route 73 in Great Smoky Mountains National Park
- Coordinates: 35°45′37.204″N 83°18′8.481″W
- Area: Less than 1 acre (0.40 ha)
- Built: circa 1876
- NRHP reference No.: 76000204
- Added to NRHP: March 16, 1976

The Tyson McCarter Place was a homestead located in the Great Smoky Mountains of Sevier County, in the U.S. state of Tennessee. Before the establishment of the Great Smoky Mountains National Park in the 1930s, the homestead belonged to mountain farmer Jacob Tyson McCarter (1878–1950), a descendant of some of the area's earliest European settlers. While McCarter's house is no longer standing, several outbuildings— including a barn, springhouse, corn crib, and smokehouse— have survived, and have been placed on the National Register of Historic Places.

The Tyson McCarter Place— like the Noah Ogle Place a few miles to the west— was once characteristic of the hundreds of small farms that once dotted the isolated coves and valleys of the northern Smokies. McCarter's house and outbuildings were arranged in an unusual circular formation around an open barnyard, probably to allow the livestock maximum protection from wild animals. Another unique feature of the McCarter outbuildings is the adjoined barn and corn crib (these are usually two separate structures). Two chimney falls and the remnants of a foundation mark where McCarter's house once stood, and several well-built rock walls criss-cross the homestead.

== Location ==
The Tyson McCarter Place is situated along Webb Creek, which flows northward from its source high up on the slopes of Greenbrier Pinnacle and empties into the Middle Fork of the Little Pigeon River at Pittman Center. The 15.8-mile (25.4 km) Old Settlers Trail crosses the Tyson McCarter Place 3.2 miles (5.1 km) west of the trail's junction with the Maddron Bald Trail (near the Sevier-Cocke county line). An unmarked 0.5-mile (0.80 km) gravel maintenance road (usually gated, but open to foot traffic) connects the Tyson McCarter Place to U.S. Route 321, just west of the Rocky Grove community. With the exception of a small clearing containing the barn, corn crib, and smokehouse, and a small clearing containing the house ruins and springhouse, the area is covered in a dense hardwood forest.

== Historical structures ==
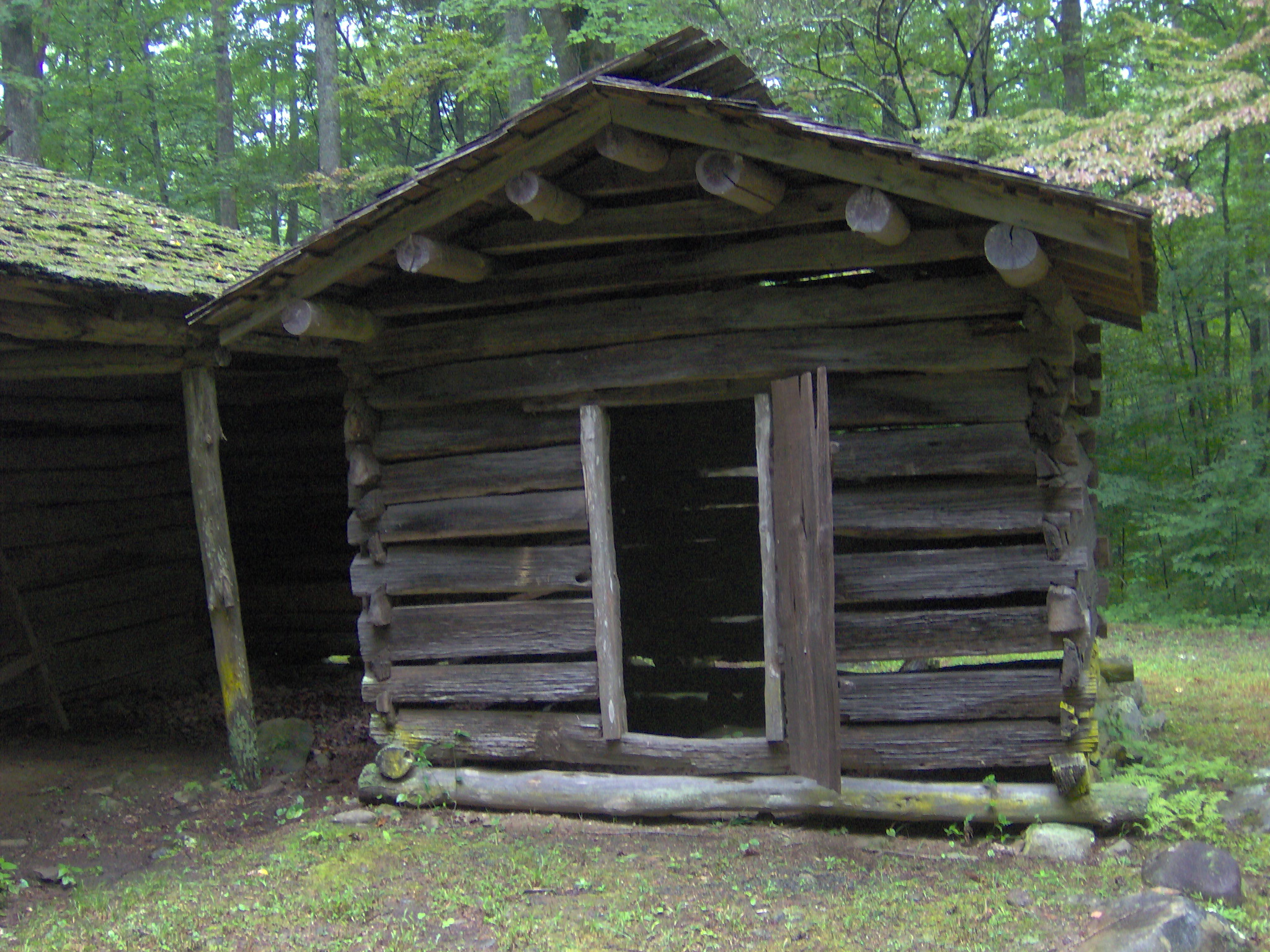
Smokehouse

The barn and outbuildings at the Tyson McCarter Place were probably built around 1876 (they were definitely built before 1900) The farm was one of a dozen or so farms that once comprised the Webb Creek community. McCarter's daughter Olive "Ollie" McCarter (1904–1998) recalled that she, her father, and her sisters built the farm's rock walls, some of which are still standing and run parallel to the Old Settlers Trail for a short distance (rock walls such as these were common in the northern Smokies, where they served the same purpose as barbed-wire fences). The McCarters raised hogs, and used the large barn stalls to house mules. The farm's main crops were corn, rye, wheat, and tobacco. Their farm also included a peach orchard and an apple orchard.

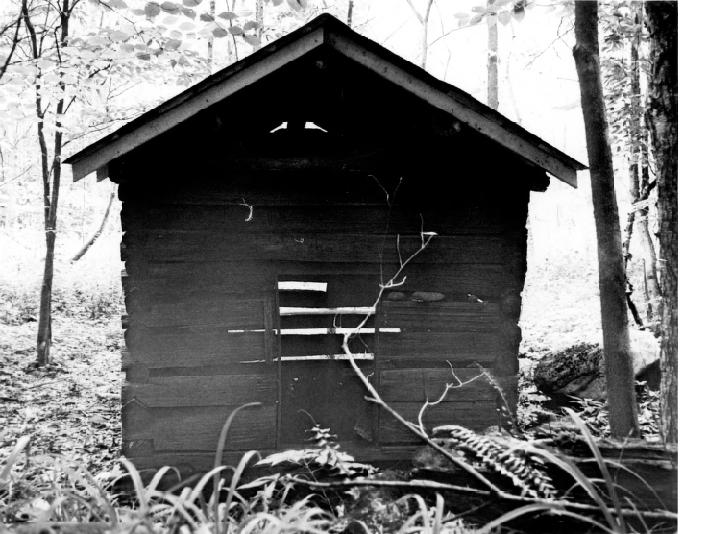
Springhouse

The barn is a one-story double-pen rectangular log "drive-through" barn with an attached lean-to corn crib. The side walls of the barn are built of saddle-notched unhewn logs, whereas the front and back walls are built with hewn logs. The barn's gabled roof was originally built with hand-split shingles, and the foundation was originally built of loose stones and logs. The two pens are each 11 feet (3.4 m) by 16 feet (4.9 m), and are separated by an 8-foot (2.4 m) drive-through (wagons were usually parked in the drive-through). The corn crib is built of unhewn saddle-notched logs, and originally included a handmade door secured by a wooden latch.

The smokehouse, used for curing meat, is a one-story structure built of hewn, dove-tail notched logs, measuring 11 feet (3.4 m) by 17 feet (5.2 m). Like the barn, the smokehouse has a gabled roof originally covered with handmade wooden shingles and a foundation of loose stones and logs. The door and storage shelves are missing. The springhouse, used for refrigeration, is a rectangular structure built of hewn chamfer notched logs, measuring 8 feet (2.4 m) by 12 feet (3.7 m). The earthen floor contains a stone trough through which a spring flowed, which kept perishables cool. Two chimney falls, each approximately 9 feet (2.7 m) tall and 30 feet (9.1 m) apart, indicate the former location of the McCarters' house.

== See also ==
- Walker Sisters Place
