= John Messer Barn =

- Messer Barn
- U.S. National Register of Historic Places
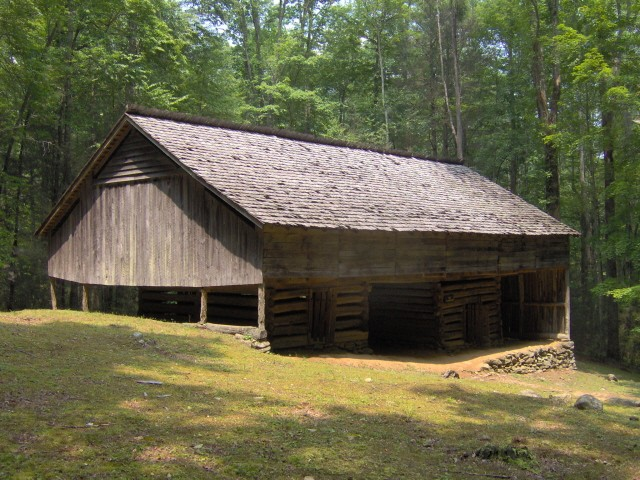

- Location within Tennessee Location within the United States
- Location: southeast of Gatlinburg near Greenbrier Cove in GSMNP
- Nearest city: Gatlinburg, Tennessee
- Coordinates: 35°41′13″N 83°23′54″W
- Area: less than one acre
- Built: 1875
- NRHP reference No.: 76000166
- Added to NRHP: January 1, 1976

The John Messer Barn is a historic structure within the Great Smoky Mountains National Park in Sevier County, Tennessee, United States. Located along the Porters Creek Trail in the Greenbrier valley, it was constructed in 1875 by Pinkney Whaley. The Whaleys later sold their farm to John H. Messer, who was married to Pinkney's cousin, Lucy.

In the 1930s, the Smoky Mountain Hiking Club, which constructed the Smoky Mountain Hiking Club Cabin nearby, leased the barn from the National Park Service. The barn was added to the National Register of Historic Places in 1976 and is the last surviving structure from the pre-park Greenbrier Cove community. This barn should not be confused with the Messer Barn in Cataloochee, which was built by John's cousin, Will Messer.

The Messer Barn is a type of double-cantilever barn unique to East Tennessee and rarely found outside Sevier, Blount, and Cocke counties. The barn is one story with a hayloft, and measures 25 feet (7.6 m) by 45 feet (14 m). The gabled roof, as with all double-cantilevers, has considerable overhang, allowing livestock shelter in inclement weather. Unlike the reconstructed double-cantilever barn at the Tipton Place in Cades Cove, the Messer Barn's overhang is supported by poles along the outer edge.

The barn's foundation is dry-stacked field stone and is higher on one end to compensate for the hill slope. The barn interior consists of two pens, each divided into two stalls, with a "drive-through" in the middle. While the barn walls are built of wooden boards, the pens are built of hewn logs. The barn's hayloft consists of poles set on two-foot centers.
