= Little Greenbrier School =

Historic church in Tennessee, United States

- Little Greenbrier School-Church
- U.S. National Register of Historic Places
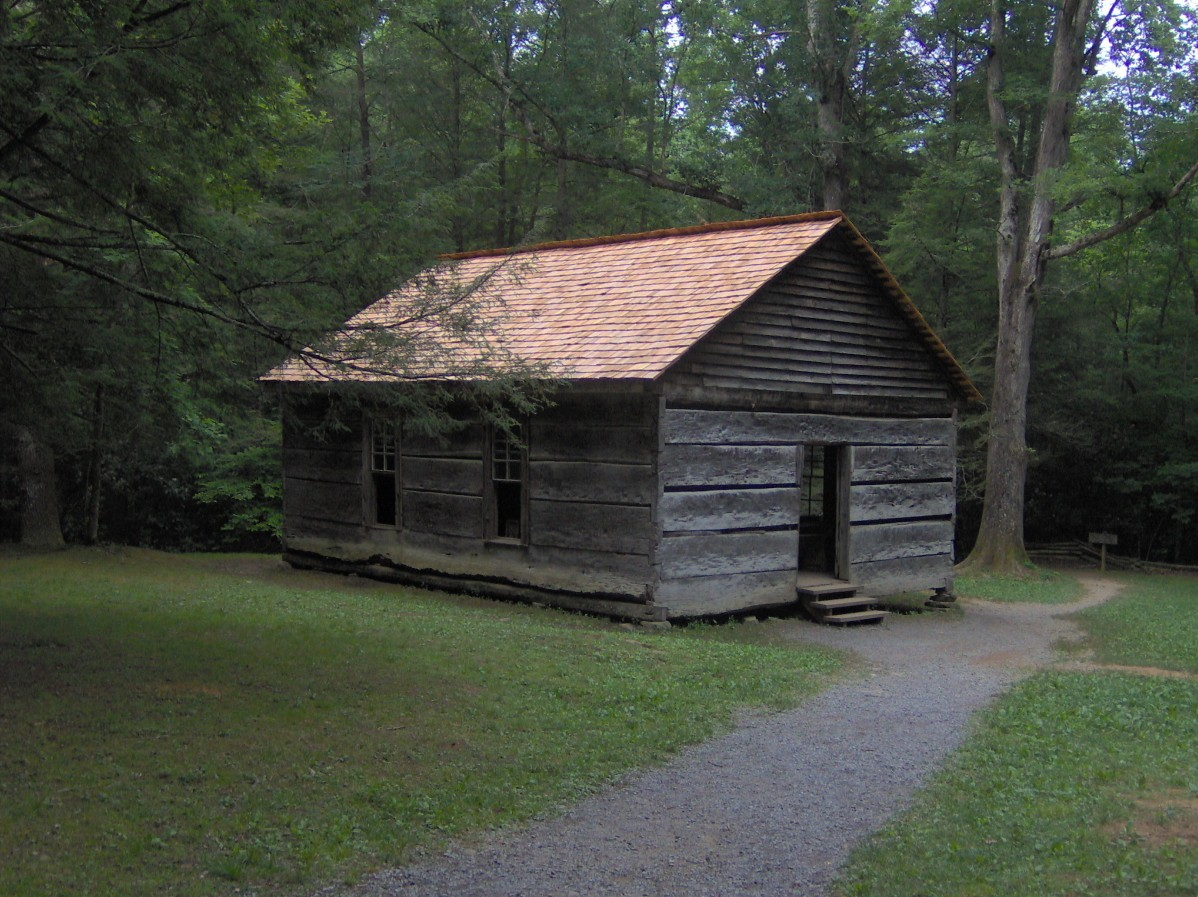

- Location within Tennessee Location within the United States
- Location: 2 mi south of Wears Valley in Great Smoky Mountains National Park
- Nearest city: Gatlinburg, Tennessee
- Coordinates: 35°41′00″N 83°38′22″W
- Area: less than one acre
- Built: 1882
- NRHP reference No.: 76000168
- Added to NRHP: January 11, 1976

The Little Greenbrier School is a former schoolhouse and church in the ghost town of Little Greenbrier in Sevier County, Tennessee, United States. Located near Gatlinburg in the Great Smoky Mountains National Park, it was built in 1882, and was used as a school and church almost continuously until 1936. When the residents of Little Greenbrier asked Sevier County to provide it with a teacher, the county replied that if the community would build a proper schoolhouse, the county would pay the teacher's salary. The land on which the school was built was donated by Gilbert Abbott, and the logs were provided by Ephraim Ogle and hauled to the site by oxen teams. Dozens of Little Greenbrier residents, among them John Walker, father of the Walker Sisters, gathered on an agreed-upon day in January 1882 and raised the schoolhouse.

Classes were first held at the Little Greenbrier School in Fall 1882. Richard Perryman was the first of 39 teachers who would teach at the school until its closure in 1936. Students throughout the Little River Valley attended the school, some making a 9-mile (14 km) daily journey from the Meigs Mountain community. The school was also used for church services by a local Primitive Baptist congregation, which established the cemetery on the other side of the road.

The schoolhouse, located near what was once the center of the Little Greenbrier community, is one story with an attic, and measures approximately 20 feet (6.1 m) by 30 feet (9.1 m). The walls are built of hewn yellow poplar logs resting on a stone foundation. The interior consists of a sawn oak board floor and a sawn chestnut ceiling, and was accessed by a white pine door on iron hinges. The school's gabled roof is covered with rived oak shingles. The chimney, located in the center of the building, was built of bricks, and fitted with an iron pipe and cook stove.
