= Maddron Bald Trail =

Hiking trail in the Great Smoky Mountains National Park

Coordinates: 35.7694°N 83.2669°W

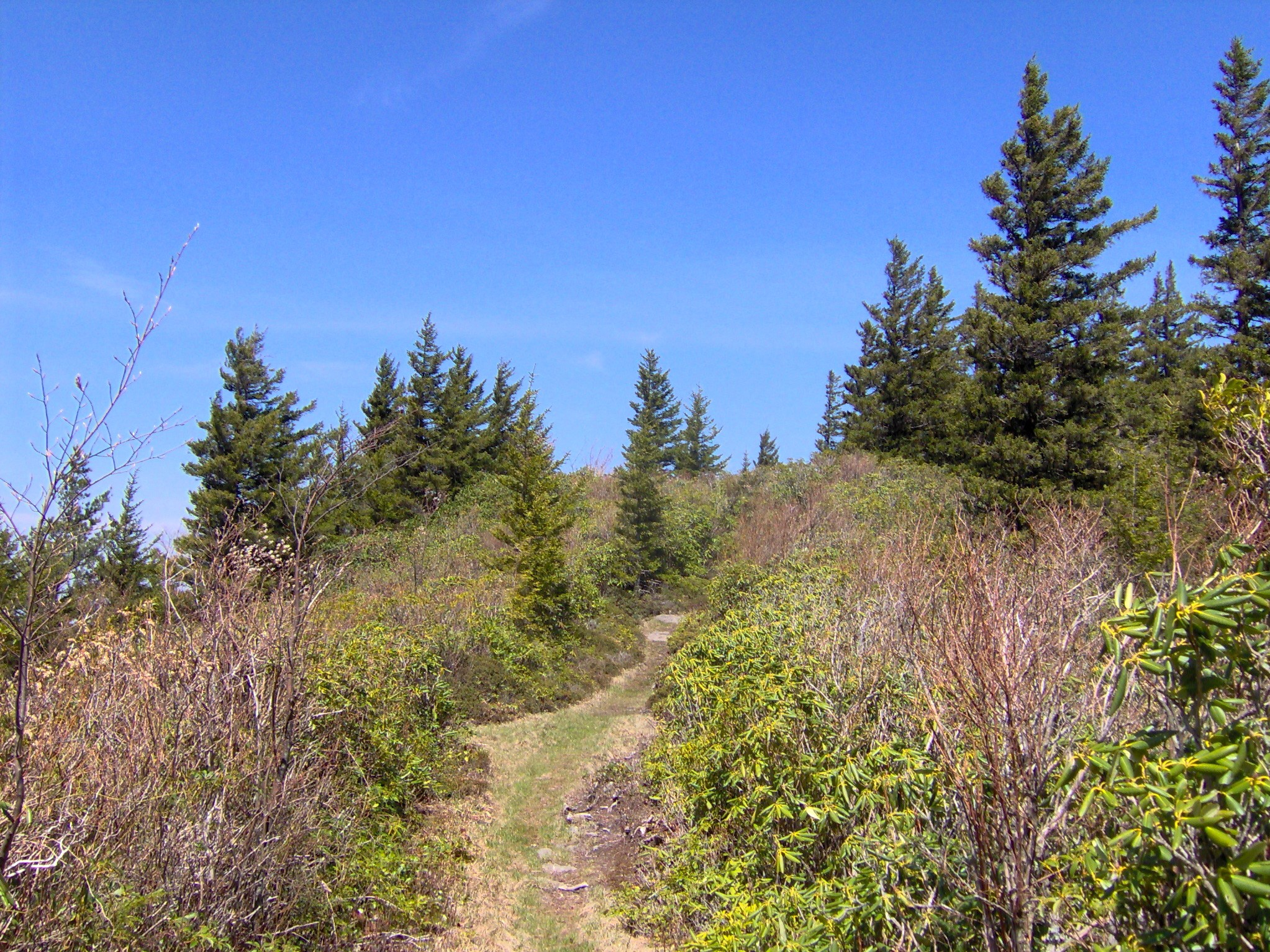
- Maddron Bald
- Length: 7.2 mi (11.6 km)
- Location: Great Smoky Mountains National Park, Tennessee, United States
- Trailheads: Baxter Road (just off US-321); Junction with the Snake Den Ridge Trail
- Use: Hiking
- Highest point: Snake Den Ridge Trail junction, 5,360 ft (1,630 m)
- Lowest point: Baxter Road, 1,860 ft (570 m)
- Difficulty: Strenuous
- Season: Open year-round
- Sights: Albright Grove, Maddron Bald, Maddron? Creek
- Hazards: stream crossings

The Maddron Bald Trail is an American hiking trail in the Great Smoky Mountains National Park of Cocke County, Tennessee. Rising from the outskirts of the Cosby community, the trail ascends Maddron Bald, a 5,212-foot (1,589 m) mountain crowned by one of the park's most substantial heath balds. The trail also provides access to Albright Grove, a patch of old growth hardwood forest that contains some of the oldest and tallest trees in the Smokies. The Maddron Bald Trail's terminus— at its junction with the Snake Den Ridge Trail— is just 0.7 miles (1.1 km) from the Appalachian Trail.

The Maddron Bald Trailhead is located at the end of Baxter Road, a short road traversing an isolated subdivision near the Cocke County-Sevier County line. Baxter Road is accessible from U.S. Route 321 a few miles east of Pittman Center. There is limited parking space at the trailhead.

== Vital information ==
- The parking area at the Maddron Bald Trailhead is in a shaded, remote area, and theft and vandalism are not uncommon.
- There are multiple stream crossings, most of which require little effort. However, mountain streams are notoriously volatile, and can quickly become ripping torrents after heavy rains.

== Landmarks ==
- Baxter Road (0.0 miles)
- Baxter Cabin (0.7 miles)
- Old Settlers Trail/Gabes Mountain Trail junction (1.2 miles)
- Indian Camp Creek crossing (appx. 2.7 miles)
- Albright Grove Loop (2.9 miles)
- Otter Creek Campsite (Campsite #29) (5.7 miles)
- Trail traverses the heath bald area (appx. 6.2-6.7 miles)
- Snake Den Ridge Trail junction (7.2 miles)
- Appalachian Trail (0.7 miles (1.1 km) south of Snake Den Ridge junction)

== Geographical information ==
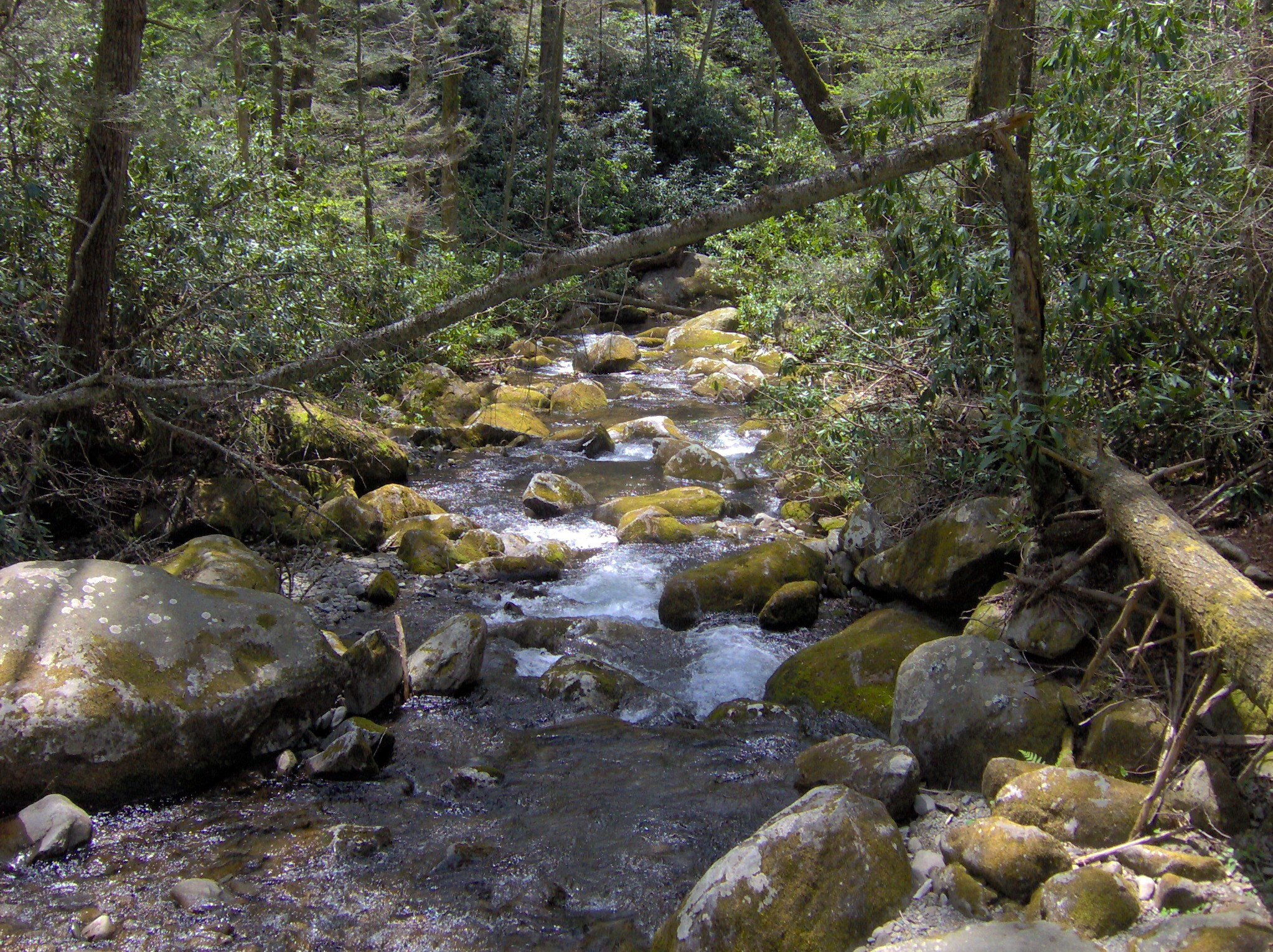
Indian Camp Creek

Maddron Bald is a narrow ridge descending northwestwardly from Inadu Knob, a 5,925-foot (1,806 m) summit situated along the crest of the Eastern Smokies near Old Black. Snake Den Ridge, which descends northeastwardly from Inadu Knob, joins Maddron Bald on Inadu's northern face to form one large ridge that presents as a wide V-shaped formation on topographical maps. Maddron Bald rises to a summit of 5,212 feet (1,589 m), although the trail's highpoint is approximately 5,360 feet (1,630 m) at its junction with the Snake Den Ridge Trail.

The western base of Maddron Bald is formed by Indian Camp Creek, which flows northward from its source on the slopes of Old Black and drains a broad valley en route to its mouth along Cosby Creek near Middle Cosby. Otter Creek, a tributary of Indian Camp Creek, forms Maddron's southern base. Another tributary, Maddron Creek, drains the northern face of Maddron Bald. These streams are all part of the greater Pigeon River watershed.

Albright Grove is situated along the northern base of Pinnacle Lead (opposite the southwestern base of Maddron Bald) between Indian Camp Creek and Dunn Creek. The grove is named after Horace Albright (1890-1987), the second director of the National Park Service. Maddron Bald is named for Lawson Maddron (c. 1809–1896), a prominent Cocke County minister. A Maddron family cemetery is located near the Maddron Bald Trail/Old Settlers Trail junction. The Maddron Bald Trail was developed in the early 1930s by the Civilian Conservation Corps, which operated from a camp near the trailhead. Some old local hiking manuals refer to the Maddron Bald Trail as the "Indian Camp Creek Trail."

== Trail synopsis ==
=== Trailhead to Indian Camp Creek crossing — 2.7 miles ===
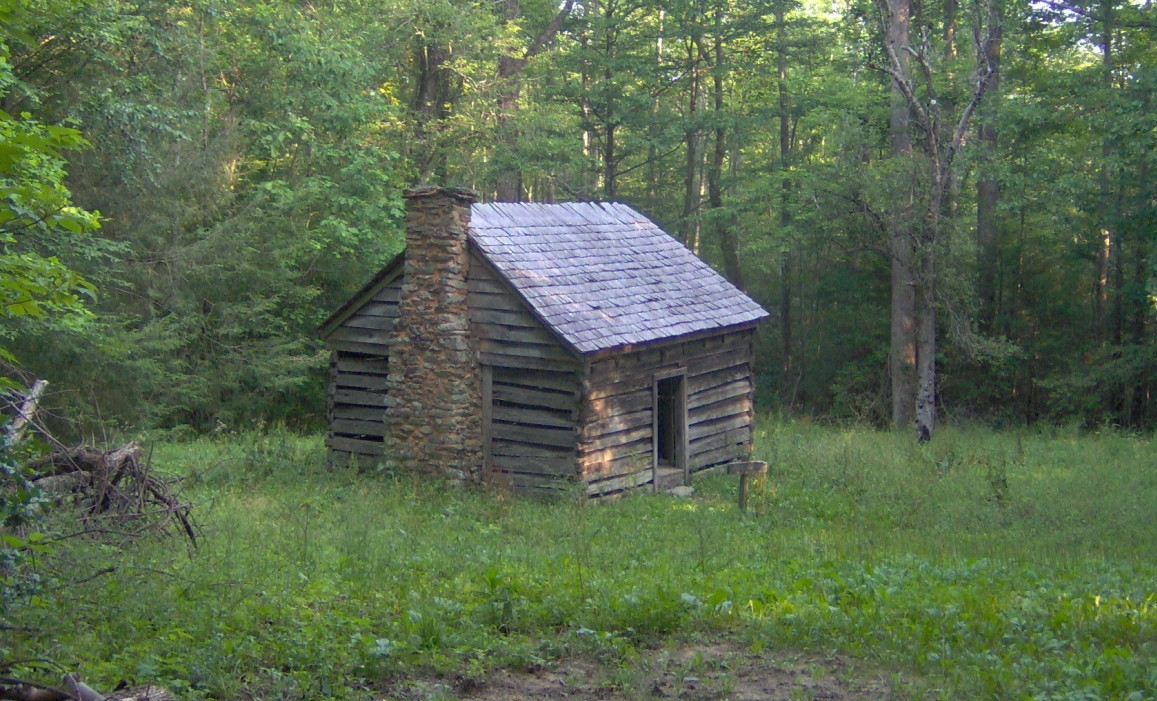
Baxter Cabin

The first 2.3 miles (3.7 km) of the Maddron Bald Trail follow a gravel maintenance road. The trail begins its gradual ascent from a shady area along the park's northern boundary (several residences line the road opposite the trailhead), with the traffic of US-321 audible beyond the treeline. At 0.7 miles (1.1 km), the trail passes the Baxter Cabin, built in 1889 by Willis Baxter as a wedding present for his son. The cabin, constructed with chestnut logs, was one of several structures preserved as examples of pioneer life in 19th-century Appalachia. Baxter's chicken coop, originally situated near the cabin, was moved to the Mountain Farm Museum at Oconaluftee, in North Carolina.

The four-way intersection of the Maddron Bald Trail, Old Settlers Trail, and Gabes Mountain Trail occurs in a large open area 1.2 miles (1.9 km) from the trailhead. The Old Settlers Trail— one of the longest trails in the park— stretches westward for 15.8 miles (25.4 km), connecting the Maddron Bald Trail with Greenbrier. The Gabes Mountain Trail stretches in the opposite direction, connecting the Maddron Bald Trail to the Cosby Campground to the east. The Maddron Bald Trail continues southward, rising gradually along the slopes above the Indian Camp Creek valley. At around 2.3 miles (3.7 km), the gravel road comes to an end, and the trail becomes a rugged dirt path. The trail crosses Indian Camp Creek via footbridge approximately 2.7 miles (4.3 km) from the trailhead.

=== Indian Camp Creek crossing to Otter Creek Campsite — 3 miles ===
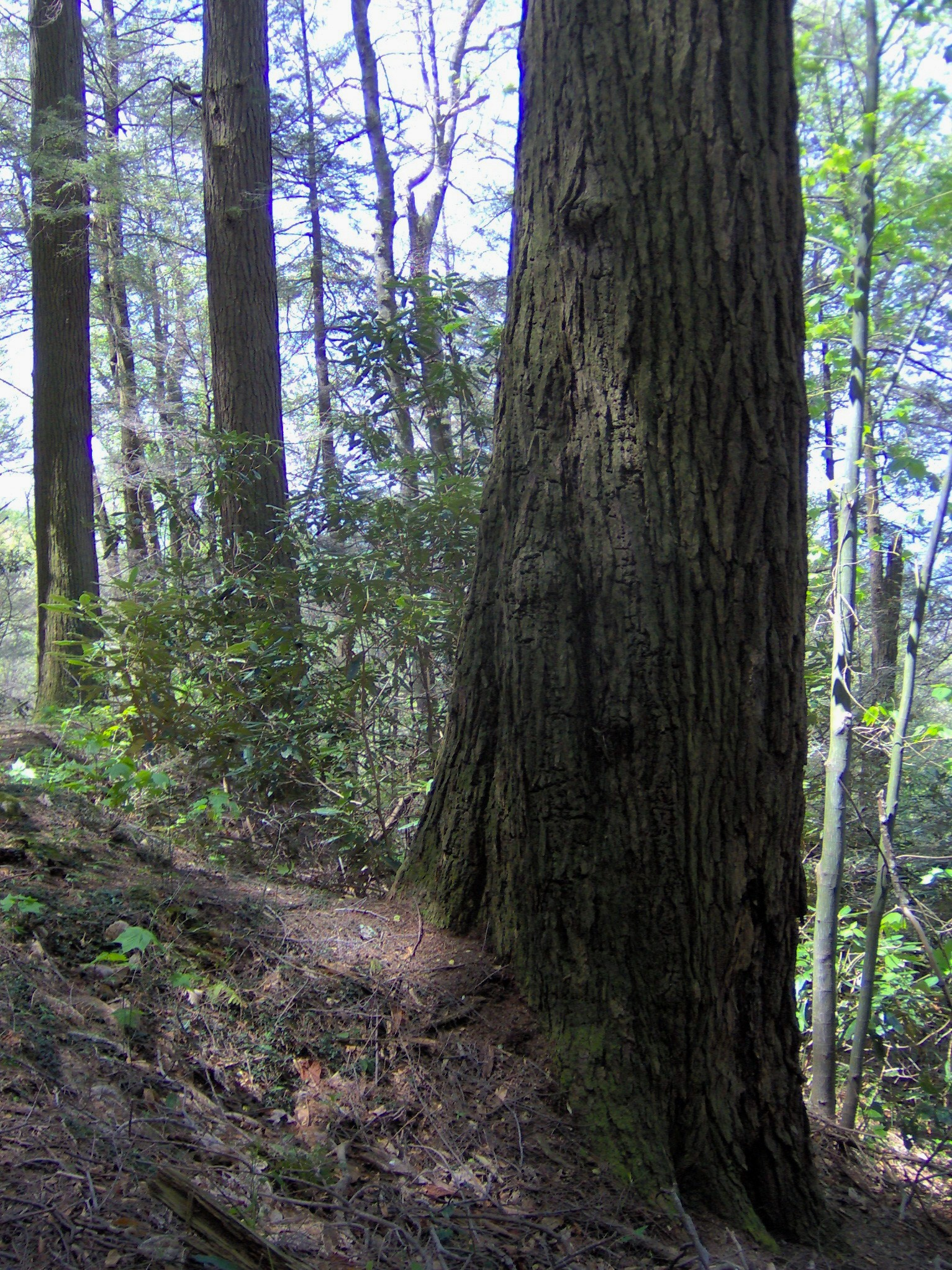
Albright Grove

Beyond Indian Camp Creek, the Maddron Bald Trail continues its ascent to the south toward Albright Grove. The Albright Grove Loop is a 0.7-mile (1.1 km) trail that departs the Maddron Bald Trail 2.9 miles (4.7 km) from the trailhead and rejoins it 3.2 miles (5.1 km) from the trailhead. Thus, the detour along the Albright Grove Loop adds 0.4 miles (0.64 km) to the hike.

Albright Grove is a rare old growth example of a cove hardwood forest, one of the most diverse forest types in North America. Most of the large hardwood trees in the Smokies were cleared by logging operations or killed by blights in the first half of the 20th century. While Albright Grove suffered through the various blights and infestations, it was never intensively logged. Hemlock and poplar trees dominate the grove, although fraser magnolia, basswood, and beech are not uncommon. Some of the trees are over 200 years old.

Beyond the first Albright Grove Loop access, the Maddron Bald Trail continues to follow Indian Camp Creek southeastward and ascends to nearly 4,000 feet (1,200 m) before crossing the creek and turning east. The trail crosses Copperhead Creek at approximately 4.5 miles (7.2 km) and ascends gradually along the ridge to Otter Creek. The Otter Creek Campsite (Campsite #29) is located along the opposite (north) bank of the creek. There is no footbridge across Otter Creek, but the creek is easily forded at normal water levels.

=== Otter Creek Campsite to Snake Den Ridge Trail junction — 1.5 miles ===
After passing the Otter Creek Campsite, the Maddron Bald Trail begins a sharp ascent, at first to the north, but gradually winding its way westward up the south flank of the ridge. At approximately 6 miles (9.7 km), the trail switches back to the east to ascend Maddron Bald's ridgecrest. Maddron's heath bald spans the ridgecrest between roughly 6.2 miles (10.0 km) and 6.7 miles (10.8 km) from the trailhead. The "heath" (heaths are often called "hells" in Appalachia) mainly consists of dense rhododendron thickets. In some places, the thicket rises nearly 10 feet (0.0030 km) above the ground. In most areas, however, it's much lower, allowing unobstructed views of the mountains to the south. The thickets are interspersed with spruce trees, which are vestiges of the northern-style coniferous forest found in the park's higher elevations.

Beyond the heath bald, the Maddron Bald Trail descends briefly to a gap before entering one final steep climb to the Snake Den Ridge Trail junction. The Appalachian Trail is 0.7 miles (1.1 km) to the south, and the Cosby Campground is 4.6 miles (7.4 km) to the northeast. The Snake Den Ridge Trail, from this point to the Cosby Campground, is mostly downhill.

== Photo gallery ==
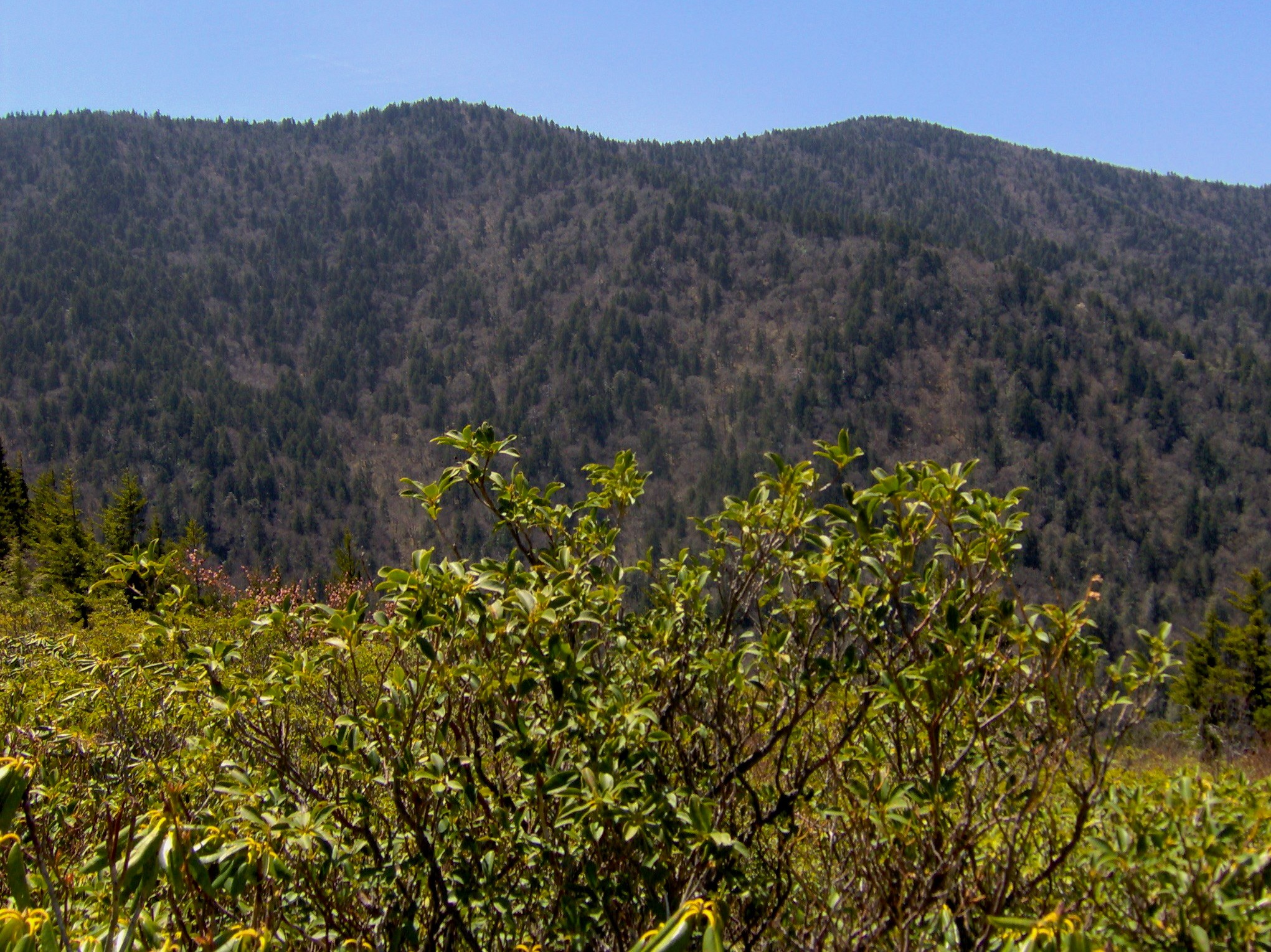
Inadu Knob (left) and Old Black (right), viewed from Maddron Bald

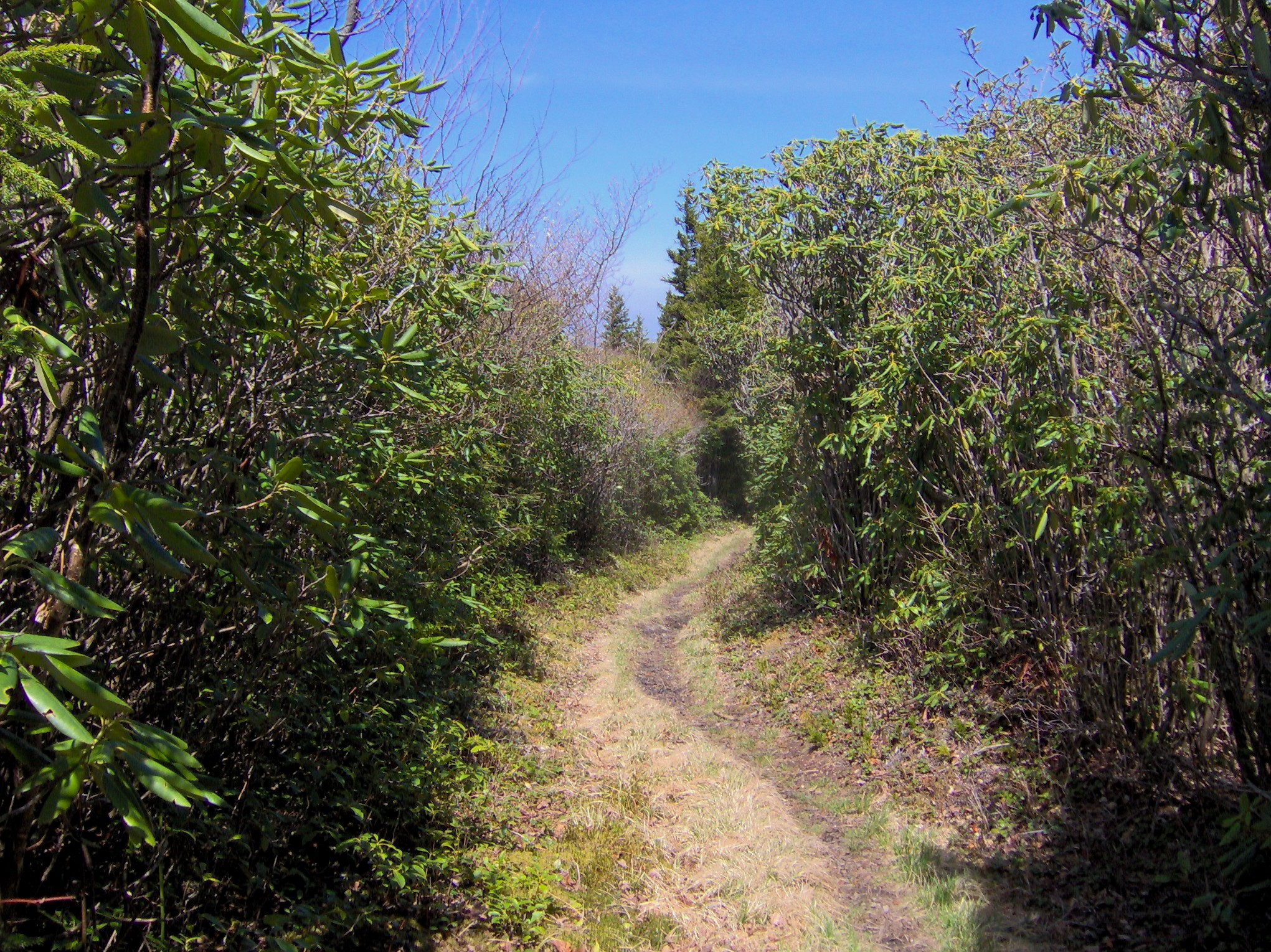
Dense rhododendron thickets, near Maddron Bald's summit

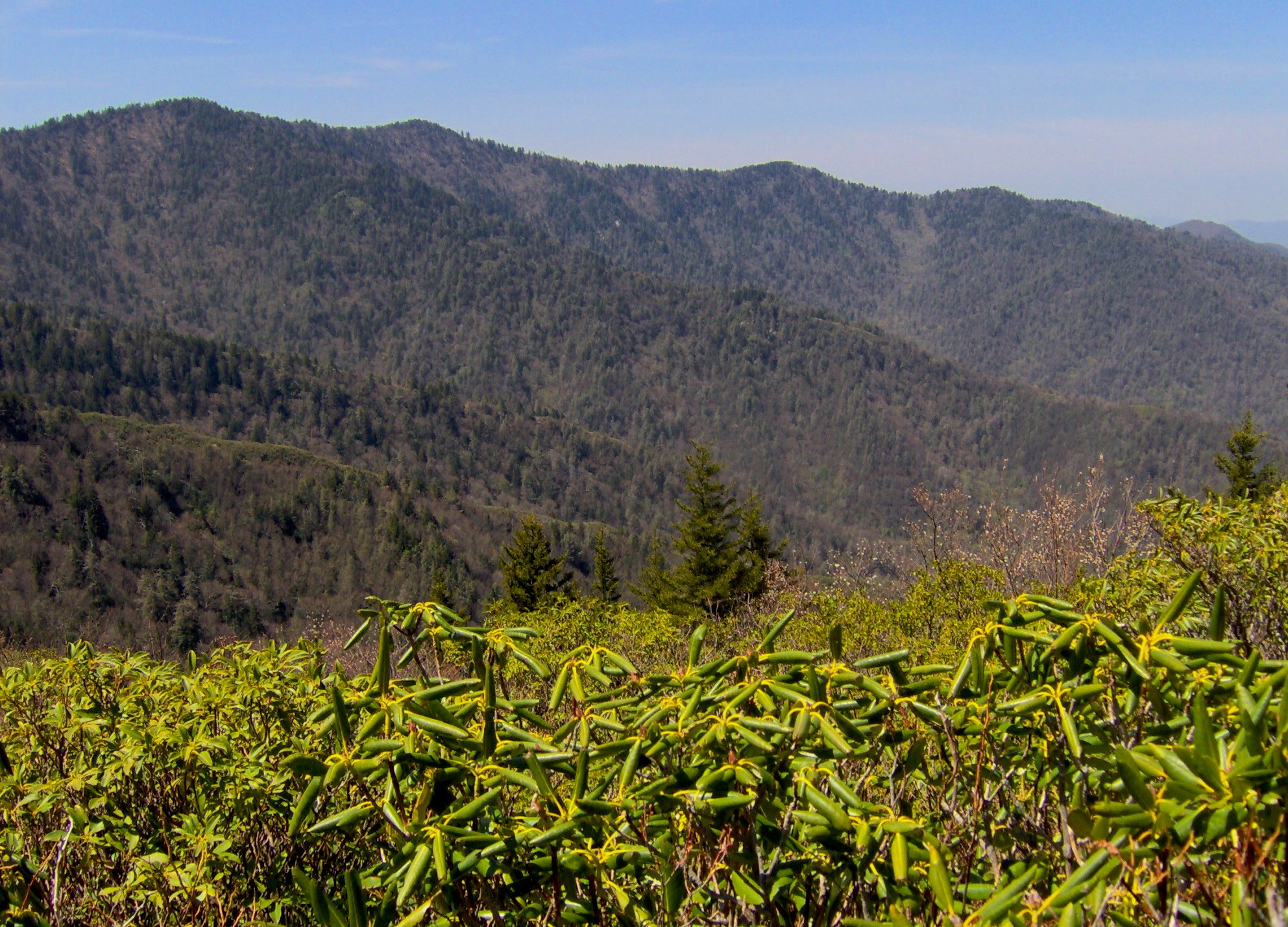
Pinnacle Lead, viewed from Maddron Bald

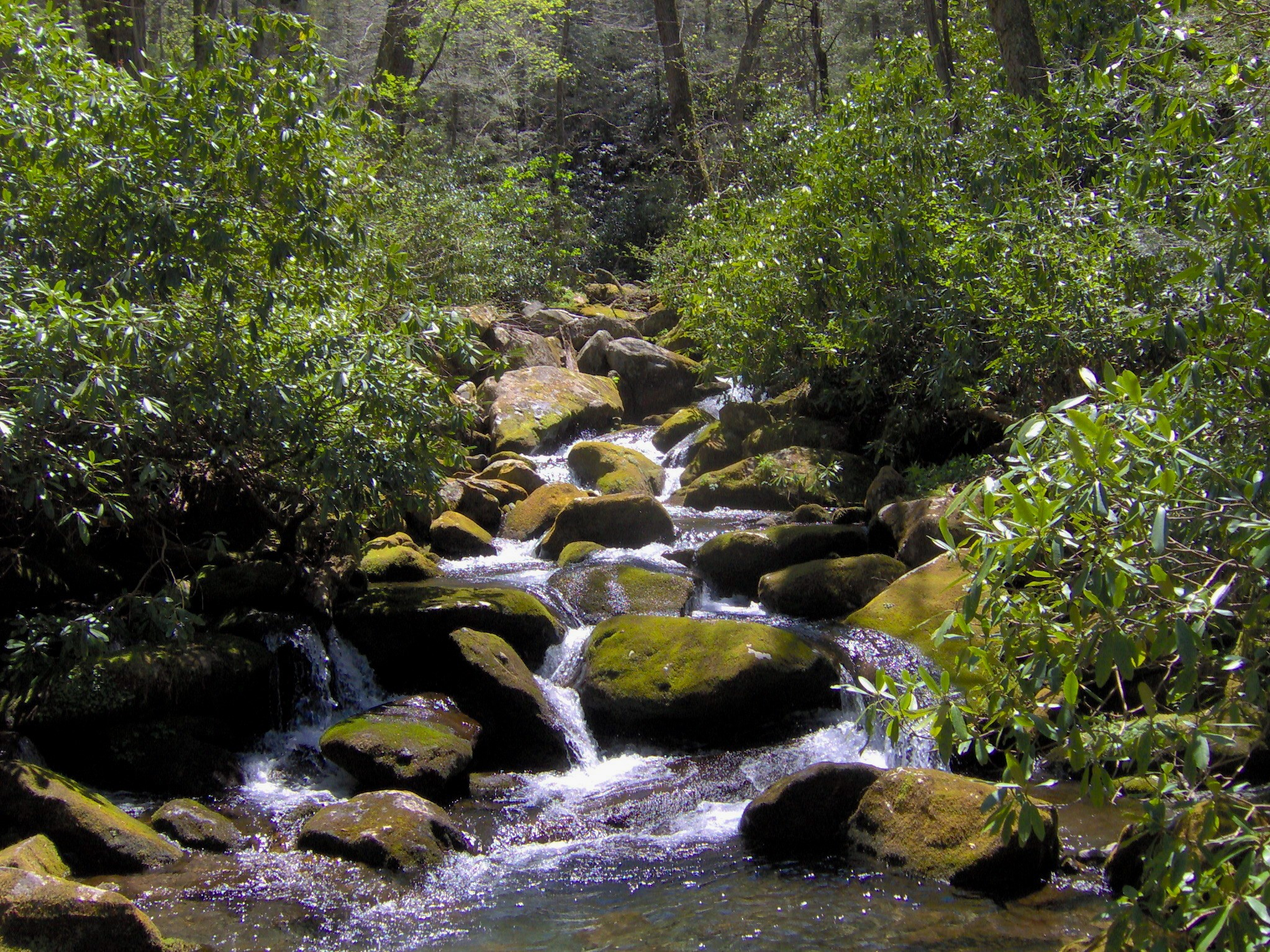
Copperhead Branch, between Albright Grove and Campsite 29
