= Great Smoky Mountains =

American mountain range along North Carolina/Tennessee state line

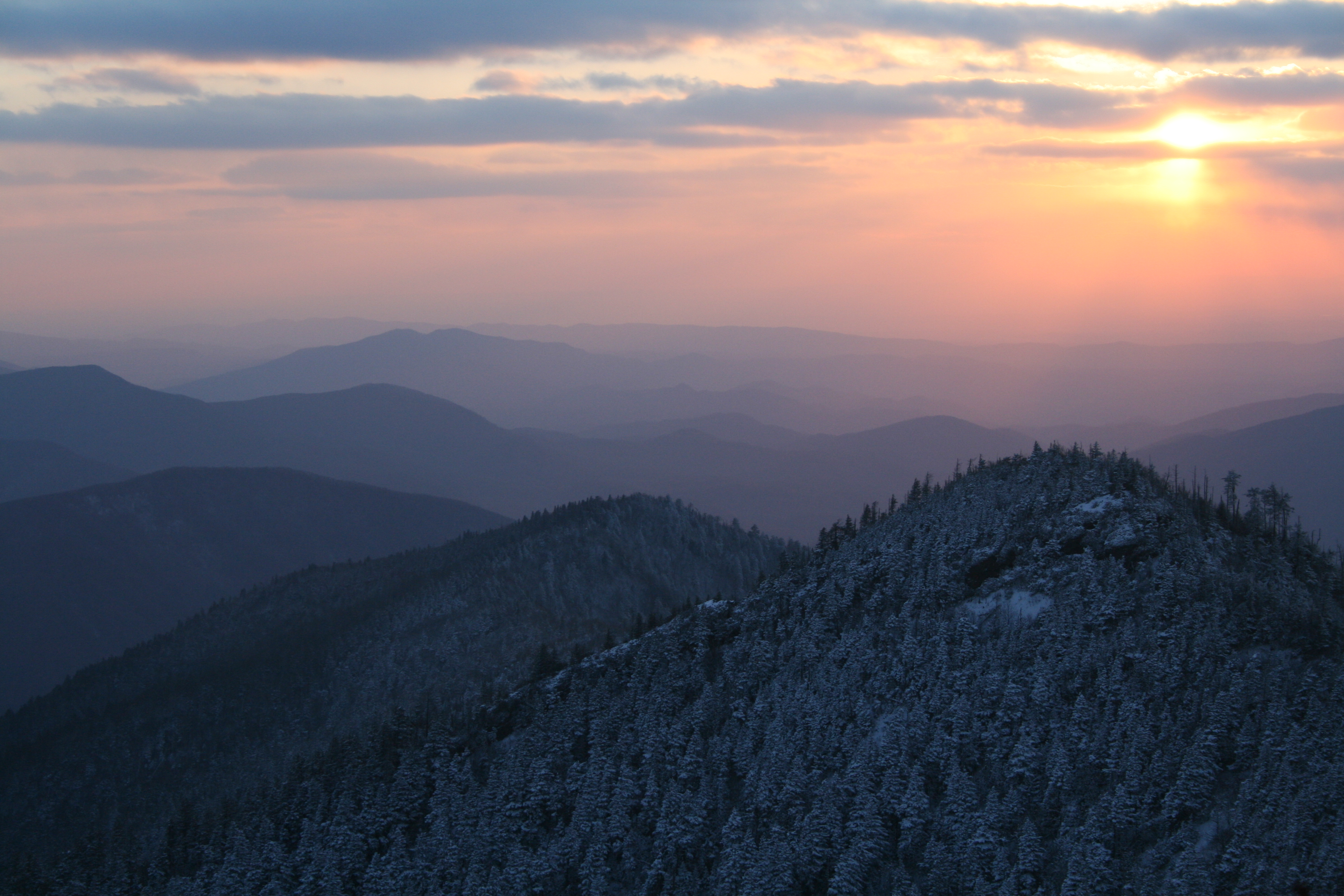
- The Smoky Mountains viewed from atop Mount Le Conte in Sevier County, Tennessee, in April 2007

Highest point
- Peak: Kuwohi
- Elevation: 6,643 ft (2,025 m)
- Coordinates: 35°. 36’ 42.3468”N 83° 29’ 22.3728”W

Geography
- Appalachian Mountain system
- Country: United States
- States: Tennessee; North Carolina
- Parent range: Blue Ridge Mountains
- Borders on: Bald Mountains; Unicoi Mountains; Plott Balsams

Geology
- Orogeny: Alleghanian

The Great Smoky Mountains (Cherokee: ᎡᏆ ᏚᏧᏍᏚ ᏙᏓᎸ, Equa Dutsusdu Dodalv) are a mountain range rising along the Tennessee–North Carolina border in the southeastern United States. They are a subrange of the Appalachian Mountains and form part of the Blue Ridge Physiographic Province. The range is also known as the Smoky Mountains, and the name is commonly shortened to the Smokies. The Smokies are best known as the home of Great Smoky Mountains National Park, which protects most of the range. The park was established in 1934 and, with over 11 million visits per year, is the most visited national park in the United States.

The Smokies are part of an International Biosphere Reserve. The range is home to an estimated 187,000 acres (76,000 ha) of old-growth forest, constituting the largest such stand east of the Mississippi River. The coves hardwood forests in the range's lower elevations are among the most diverse ecosystems in North America, and the Southern Appalachian spruce–fir forest that covers the upper elevations is the largest of its kind. The Smokies are home to the densest black bear population in the Eastern United States and the most diverse salamander population outside of the tropics.

Along with the biosphere reserve, the Great Smoky Mountains have been designated a UNESCO World Heritage Site. The U.S. National Park Service preserves and maintains 78 structures within the national park that were once part of the numerous small Appalachian communities scattered throughout the range's river valleys and coves. The park contains five historic districts and nine individual listings on the National Register of Historic Places.

The name "Smoky" comes from the natural fog that often hangs over the range and presents as large smoke plumes from a distance. This fog is caused by the vegetation emitting volatile organic compounds, chemicals that have a high vapor pressure and easily form vapors at normal temperature and pressure.

== Geography ==
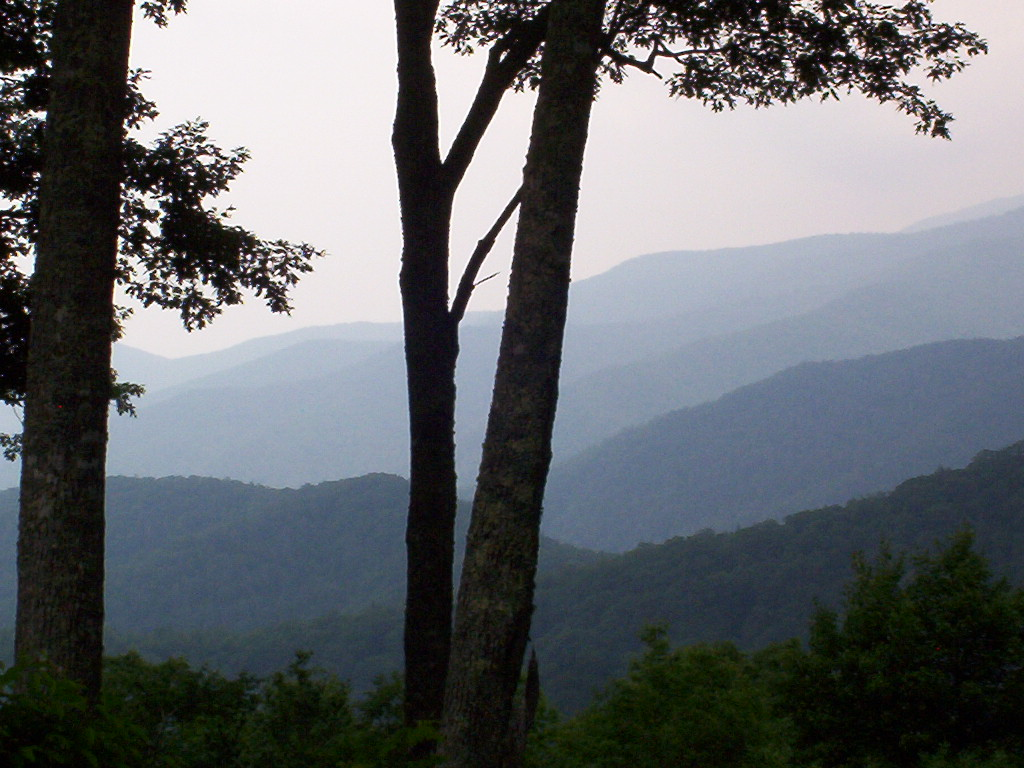
The Great Smoky Mountains near Gatlinburg, Tennessee

A waterfall in the Smoky Mountains

The Great Smoky Mountains stretch from the Pigeon River in the northeast to the Little Tennessee River in the southeast. The northwestern half of the range gives way to a series of elongate ridges known as the "Foothills," the outermost of which include Chilhowee Mountain and English Mountain. The range is roughly bounded on the south by the Tuckasegee River and to the southeast by Soco Creek and Jonathan Creek. The Smokies comprise parts of Blount County, Sevier County, Monroe County and Cocke County in Tennessee and Swain County and Haywood County in North Carolina.

The sources of several rivers are located in the Smokies, including the Little Pigeon River, the Oconaluftee River, and Little River. Streams in the Smokies are part of the Tennessee River watershed and are thus entirely west of the Eastern Continental Divide. The largest stream entirely within the park is Abrams Creek, which rises in Cades Cove and empties into the Chilhowee Lake impoundment of the Little Tennessee River near Chilhowee Dam.

Other major streams include Hazel Creek and Eagle Creek in the southwest, Raven Fork near Oconaluftee, Cosby Creek near Cosby, and Roaring Fork near Gatlinburg. The Little Tennessee River passes through five impediments along the range's southwestern boundary, namely Tellico Lake, Chilhowee Lake, Calderwood Lake, Cheoah Lake, and Fontana Lake.

=== Notable peaks ===
The highest point in the Smokies is Kuwohi (also known as Clingmans Dome, its former official name), the tallest mountain in Tennessee, which rises to an elevation of 6,643 feet (2,025 m). It has the range's highest topographic prominence at 4,503 feet (1,373 m). Mount Le Conte is the tallest (i.e., from immediate base to summit) mountain in the range, rising 5,301 feet (1,616 m) from its base in Gatlinburg to its 6,593-foot (2,010 m) summit.

Mountain	Elevation	Prominence	General location	Named after
Kuwohi	6,643 ft; 2,025 m	4,503 ft; 1,373 m	Central Smokies	"Mulberry place" in Cherokee, formerly Clingmans Dome
Mount Guyot	6,621 ft; 2,018 m	1,581 ft; 482 m	Eastern Smokies	Arnold Guyot (1807–1884), surveyor
Mount Le Conte	6,593 ft; 2,010 m	1,360 ft; 410 m	Central Smokies	Joseph Le Conte or John Le Conte, scientists
Mount Chapman	6,431 ft; 1,960 m	577 ft; 176 m	Eastern Smokies	David Chapman (1876–1944), park promoter
Old Black	6,360 ft; 1,940 m	170 ft; 52 m	Eastern Smokies	Spruce-fir stand at summit
Luftee Knob	6,215 ft; 1,894 m	314 ft; 96 m	Eastern Smokies	Oconaluftee River
Mount Kephart	6,218 ft; 1,895 m	657 ft; 200 m	Central Smokies	Horace Kephart (1862–1931), author
Mount Collins	6,197 ft; 1,889 m	465 ft; 142 m	Central Smokies	Robert Collins, mountain guide
Marks Knob	6,162 ft; 1,878 m	appx. 249 ft; 76 m	Eastern Smokies	
Tricorner Knob	6,145 ft; 1,873 m	160 ft; 49 m	Eastern Smokies	Intersection of Balsam crest and Great Smokies crest
Mount Hardison	6,145 ft; 1,873 m	134 ft; 41 m	Eastern Smokies	James Archibald Hardison (1867–1930)
Andrews Bald	5,909 ft; 1,801 m	160 ft; 49 m	Central Smokies	possibly Andres Thompson, early settler
Mount Sterling	5,842 ft; 1,781 m	663 ft; 202 m	Eastern Smokies	possibly lead at mountain's base mistaken for silver
Silers Bald	5,597 ft; 1,706 m	337 ft; 103 m	Western Smokies	Jesse Siler, who used the mountain for grazing
Thunderhead Mountain	5,528 ft; 1,685 m	1,087 ft; 331 m	Western Smokies	constant cloud cover
Gregory Bald	4,949 ft; 1,508 m	1,107 ft; 337 m	Western Smokies	Russell Gregory (1805–1863), Cades Cove resident
Mount Cammerer	4,928 ft; 1,502 m	8 ft; 2.4 m	Eastern Smokies	Arno B. Cammerer (1883–1941), NPS director
Chimney Tops	4,725 ft; 1,440 m	appx. 200 ft; 61 m	Central Smokies	resemblance to cabin chimneys
Blanket Mountain	4,607 ft; 1,404 m	appx. 500 ft; 150 m	Western Smokies	blanket left atop mountain by surveyor Return Meigs for a reference point
Shuckstack	4,020 ft; 1,230 m	300 ft; 91 m	Western Smokies	

=== Climate ===
The Smokies rise prominently above the surrounding low terrain. For example, Mount Le Conte (6,593 feet [2,010 m]) rises more than a mile (1.6 km) above its base. Because of their prominence, the Smokies receive a heavy annual amount of precipitation. Annual precipitation amounts range from 50 to 80 in (1,300 to 2,000 mm), and snowfall in the winter can be heavy, especially on the higher slopes. For comparison, the surrounding terrain has annual precipitation of around 40 to 50 in (1,000 to 1,300 mm). Flash flooding often occurs after heavy rain.

In 2004, the remnants of Hurricane Frances caused major flooding, landslides, and high winds, which were soon followed by Hurricane Ivan, making the situation worse. Other post-hurricanes, including Hurricane Hugo in 1989, have caused similar damage in the Smokies.

As for temperatures, the average temperature difference between the mountains (Newfound Gap around 5,000 feet (1,500 m) MSL and the valleys (Park Headquarters around 1,600 feet (490 m) MSL in the Great Smoky Mountains National Park is between 10 and 13 °F (5.6 and 7.2 °C), with highs and between 3 and 6 °F (1.7 and 3.3 °C) with lows. The difference between high temperatures is similar to the moist adiabatic lapse rate (3.3 degrees Fahrenheit per 1,000 ft | 6 °C/km), while the smaller difference between low temperatures is the result of frequent temperature inversions developing in the morning, especially during autumn.

Strong damaging winds (80 to 100 mph (130 to 160 km/h), or sometimes greater) are observed a few times each year around the Smoky Mountains during the cool season (October through April), as a result of a phenomenon known as mountain waves. These mountain wave winds are strongest in a narrow area along the foothills and can create extensive areas of fallen trees and roof damage, especially around Cades Cove in the Great Smoky Mountains National Park and the Camp Creek community. Strong winds created by mountain waves were a contributing factor with the devastating Gatlinburg fire on November 28, 2016, during the 2016 Great Smoky Mountains wildfires. Damaging winds can also be generated by strong thunderstorms, with tornadoes and strong thunderstorm complexes (also known as mesoscale convective systems) occasionally affecting the Smoky Mountains.

The climate of Kuwohi is hemiboreal (Köppen Dfb, Trewartha Dcb). As with much of the southern Blue Ridge, the area qualifies as part of the Appalachian Rainforest. On the other hand, Gatlinburg's climate is four-season subtropical (Cfa) under Köppen (oceanic Do under Trewartha), typical of Tennessee.

Climate data for Kuwohi
Month	Jan	Feb	Mar	Apr	May	Jun	Jul	Aug	Sep	Oct	Nov	Dec	Year
Mean daily maximum °F (°C)	35 (2)	35 (2)	39 (4)	49 (9)	57 (14)	63 (17)	65 (18)	64 (18)	60 (16)	53 (12)	42 (6)	37 (3)	50 (10)
Daily mean °F (°C)	27.0 (−2.8)	26.5 (−3.1)	31.5 (−0.3)	41.5 (5.3)	50.0 (10.0)	56.0 (13.3)	59.0 (15.0)	58.0 (14.4)	53.5 (11.9)	45.5 (7.5)	35.0 (1.7)	29.0 (−1.7)	43.0 (6.1)
Mean daily minimum °F (°C)	19 (−7)	18 (−8)	24 (−4)	34 (1)	43 (6)	49 (9)	53 (12)	52 (11)	47 (8)	38 (3)	28 (−2)	21 (−6)	36 (2)
Average precipitation inches (mm)	7.0 (180)	8.2 (210)	8.2 (210)	6.5 (170)	6.0 (150)	6.9 (180)	8.3 (210)	6.8 (170)	5.1 (130)	5.4 (140)	6.4 (160)	7.3 (190)	82.1 (2,100)
Average snowfall inches (cm)	18 (46)	20 (51)	26 (66)	5 (13)	trace	0 (0)	0 (0)	0 (0)	trace	2 (5.1)	5 (13)	8 (20)	84 (214.1)
Source: NPS

Climate data for Gatlinburg, Tennessee
Month	Jan	Feb	Mar	Apr	May	Jun	Jul	Aug	Sep	Oct	Nov	Dec	Year
Mean daily maximum °F (°C)	51 (11)	54 (12)	61 (16)	71 (22)	79 (26)	86 (30)	88 (31)	87 (31)	83 (28)	73 (23)	61 (16)	52 (11)	71 (22)
Daily mean °F (°C)	39.5 (4.2)	41.5 (5.3)	47.5 (8.6)	56.5 (13.6)	64.5 (18.1)	72.0 (22.2)	73.5 (23.1)	73.5 (23.1)	69.0 (20.6)	58.0 (14.4)	47.0 (8.3)	40.0 (4.4)	57.0 (13.9)
Mean daily minimum °F (°C)	28 (−2)	29 (−2)	34 (1)	42 (6)	50 (10)	58 (14)	59 (15)	60 (16)	55 (13)	43 (6)	33 (1)	28 (−2)	43 (6)
Average precipitation inches (mm)	4.8 (120)	4.8 (120)	5.3 (130)	4.5 (110)	4.5 (110)	5.2 (130)	5.7 (140)	5.3 (130)	3.0 (76)	3.1 (79)	3.4 (86)	4.5 (110)	54.1 (1,341)
Average snowfall inches (cm)	2.3 (5.8)	2.9 (7.4)	trace	0 (0)	0 (0)	0 (0)	0 (0)	0 (0)	0 (0)	trace	0.7 (1.8)	1.0 (2.5)	6.9 (17.5)
Source: NPS

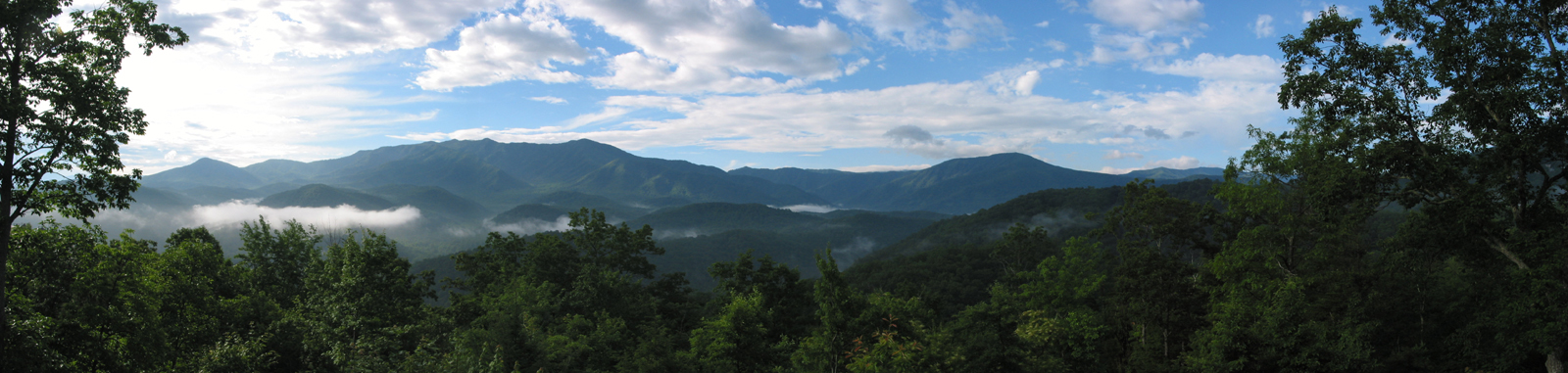
180-degree panoramic view of the Smokies

== Geology ==
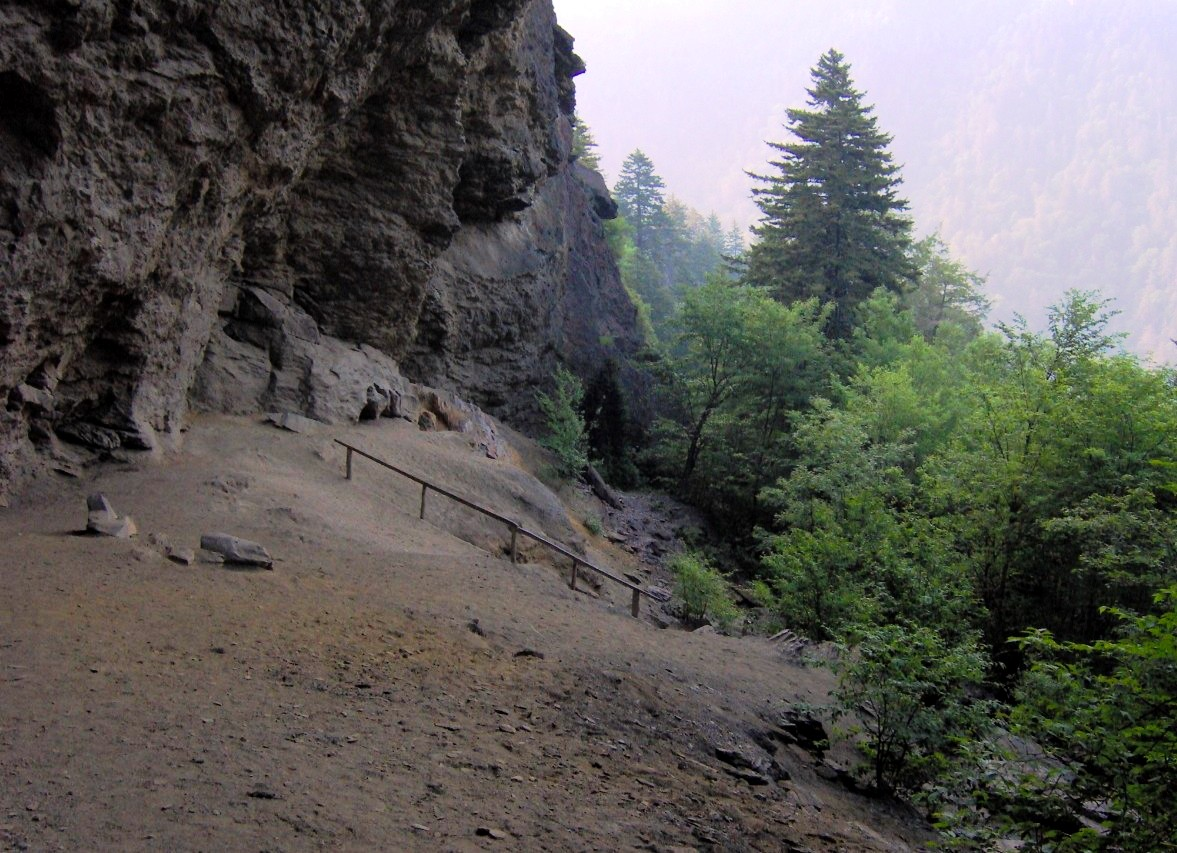
The Alum Cave Bluffs

Most of the rocks in the Great Smoky Mountains consist of Late Precambrian rocks that are part of a formation known as the Ocoee Supergroup. The Ocoee Supergroup consists primarily of slightly metamorphosed sandstones, phyllites, schists, and slate. Early Precambrian rocks, which include the oldest rocks in the Smokies, comprise the dominant rock type in the Raven Fork Valley (in the Oconaluftee valley) and lower Tuckasegee River between Cherokee and Bryson City. They consist primarily of metamorphic gneiss, granite, and schist. Cambrian sedimentary rocks are found among the outer reaches of the Foothills to the northwest and in limestone coves such as Cades Cove.

The Precambrian gneiss and schists—the oldest rocks in the Smokies—formed over a billion years ago from the accumulation of marine sediments and igneous rock in a primordial ocean. In the Late Precambrian period, this ocean expanded, and the more recent Ocoee Supergroup rocks formed from accumulations of the eroding land mass onto the ocean's continental shelf.

By the end of the Paleozoic era, the ancient ocean had deposited a thick layer of marine sediments which left behind sedimentary rocks such as limestone. During the Ordovician period, the North American and African plates collided, destroying the ancient ocean and initiating the Alleghenian orogeny—the mountain-building epoch that created the Appalachian range. The Mesozoic era saw the rapid erosion of the softer sedimentary rocks from the new mountains, re-exposing the older Ocoee Supergroup formations.

Around 20,000 years ago, subarctic glaciers advanced southward across North America, and although they never reached the Smokies, the advancing glaciers led to colder mean annual temperatures and an increase in precipitation throughout the range. Trees were unable to survive at the higher elevations and were replaced by tundra vegetation. Spruce-fir forests occupied the valleys and slopes below approximately 4,950 feet (1,510 m). The persistent freezing and thawing during this period created the large blockfields that are often found at the base of large mountain slopes.

Between 16,500 and 12,500 years ago, the glaciers to the north retreated and mean annual temperatures rose. The tundra vegetation disappeared, and the spruce-fir forests retreated to the highest elevations. Hardwood trees moved into the region from the coastal plains, replacing the spruce-fir forests in the lower elevations. The temperatures continued warming until around 6,000 years ago, when they began to gradually grow cooler.

== Flora ==
Heavy logging in the late 19th century and early 20th century devastated much of the forests of the Smokies, but the National Park Service estimates 187,000 acres (760 km^{2}) of old-growth forest remains, comprising the largest old-growth stand in the Eastern United States. Most of the forest is a mature second-growth hardwood forest. The range's 1,600 species of flowering plants include over 100 species of native trees and 100 species of native shrubs. The Smokies are also home to over 450 species of non-vascular plants and 2,000 species of fungi.

The forests of the Smokies are typically divided into three zones:

- The cove hardwood forests in the stream valleys, coves, and lower mountain slopes
- The northern hardwood forests on the higher mountain slopes
- The spruce-fir or boreal forest at the very highest elevations

Appalachian balds—patches of land where trees are unexpectedly absent or sparse—are interspersed through the mid-to-upper elevations in the range. Balds include grassy balds, which are highland meadows covered primarily by thick grasses, and heath balds, which are dense thickets of rhododendron and mountain laurel typically occurring on narrow ridges. Mixed oak-pine forests are found on dry ridges, especially on the south-facing North Carolina side of the range. Stands dominated by the Eastern hemlock (Tsuga canadensis) are occasionally found along streams and broad slopes above 3,500 feet (1,100 m).

=== Cove hardwood forest ===
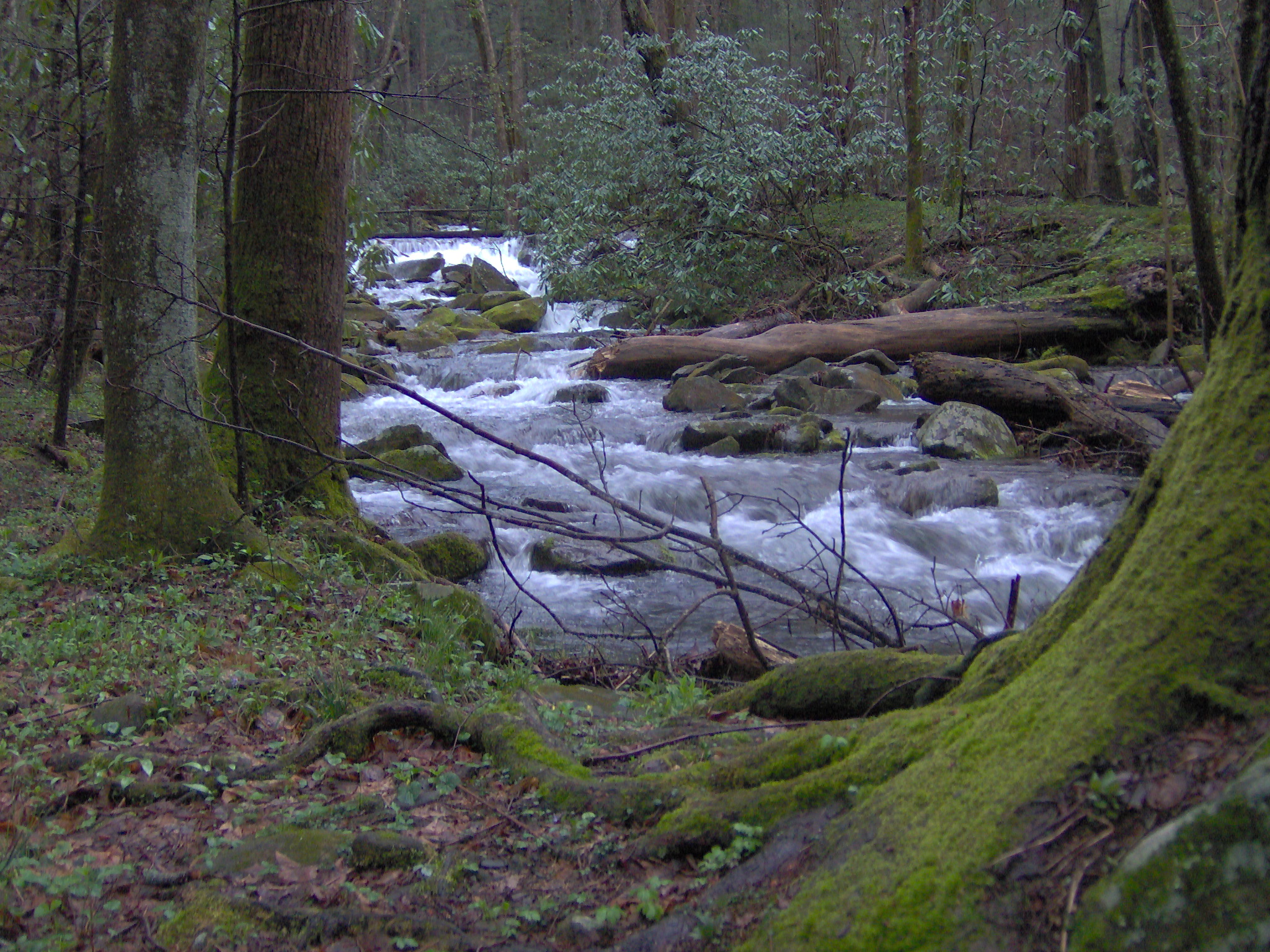
Cove hardwood forest along Cosby Creek

Cove hardwood forests, which are native to southern Appalachia, are among the most diverse forest types in North America. The cove hardwood forests of the Smokies are mostly second-growth, although some 72,000 acres (290 km^{2}) are still old-growth. The Albright Grove along the Maddron Bald Trail (between Gatlinburg and Cosby) is an accessible old-growth forest with some of the oldest and tallest trees in the entire range.

Over 130 species of trees are found among the canopies of the cove hardwood forests in the Smokies. The dominant species include yellow birch (Betula alleghaniensis), basswood (Tilia americana), yellow buckeye (Aesculus flava), tulip tree (Liriodendron tulipifera; commonly called "tulip poplar"), silverbells (Halesia carolina), sugar maple (Acer saccharum), cucumber magnolia (Magnolia acuminata), shagbark hickory (Carya ovata), Carolina hemlock (Tsuga caroliniana) and eastern hemlock (Tsuga canadensis). The American chestnut (Castanea dentata), which was arguably the most beloved tree of the range's pre-park inhabitants, was killed off by the introduced Chestnut blight in the 1920s.

The understories of the cove hardwood forest contain dozens of species of shrubs and vines. Dominant species in the Smokies include the Eastern redbud (Cercis canadensis), flowering dogwood (Cornus florida), Catawba rhododendron (Rhododendron catawbiense), mountain laurel (Kalmia latifolia), and smooth hydrangea (Hydrangea arborescens).

=== Northern hardwood forest ===
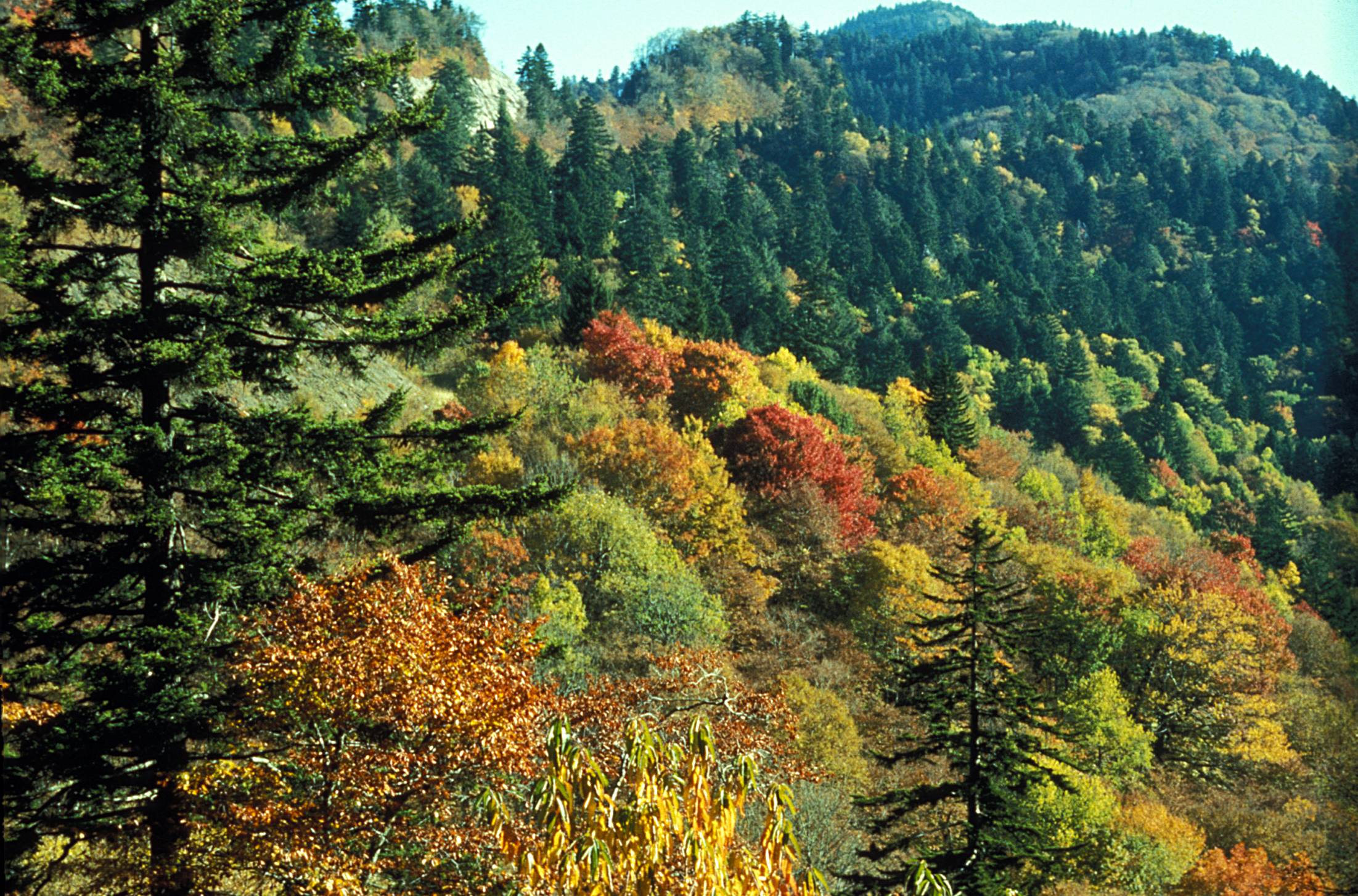
The autumn colors of the northern hardwood canopy near Newfound Gap give way to the dark-green spruce-fir canopy as altitude increases

The mean annual temperatures in the higher elevations in the Smokies are cool enough to support forest types more commonly found in the northern United States. The northern hardwood forests constitute the highest broad-leaved forest in the eastern United States. About 28,600 acres (116 km^{2}) are old-growth.

In the Smokies, the northern hardwood canopies are dominated by yellow birch (Betula alleghaniensis) and American beech (Fagus grandifolia). White basswood (Tilia heterophylla), mountain maple (Acer spicatum) and striped maple (Acer pensylvanicum), and yellow buckeye (Aesculus flava) are also present. The understory is home to diverse species such as coneflower, skunk goldenrod, Rugels ragwort, bloodroot, hydrangea, and several species of grasses and ferns.

A unique community is the beech gap, or beech orchard. Beech gaps consist of high mountain gaps that have been monopolized by beech trees. The beech trees are often twisted and contorted by the high winds that occur in these gaps. Why other tree types such as the red spruce fail to encroach into the beech gaps is unknown.

=== Spruce-fir forest ===
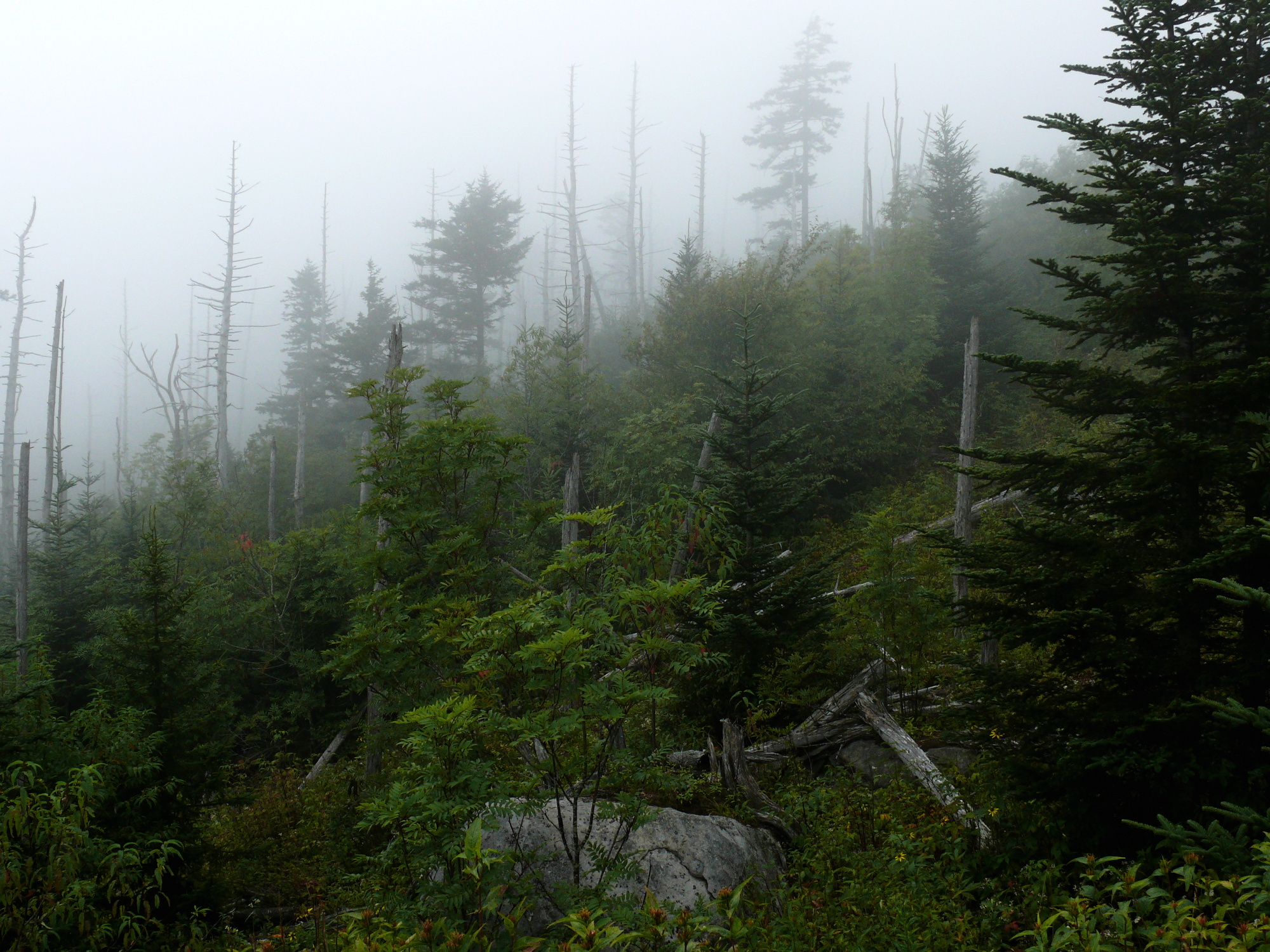
Spruce fir stand near the summit of Kuwohi

The Southern Appalachian spruce–fir forest—also called the "boreal" or "Canadian" forest—is a relic of the ice ages, when mean annual temperatures in the Smokies were too cold to support a hardwood forest. While the rise in temperatures between 12,500 and 6,000 years ago allowed the hardwoods to return, the spruce-fir forest has managed to survive on the harsh mountain tops, typically above 5,500 feet (1,700 m). About 10,600 acres (43 km^{2}) of the spruce-fir forest are old-growth.

The spruce-fir forest consists primarily of two conifer species—red spruce (Picea rubens) and Fraser fir (Abies fraseri). The Fraser firs, which are native to southern Appalachia, once dominated elevations above 6,200 feet (1,900 m) in the Smokies. Most of these firs were killed, however, by an infestation of the balsam wooly adelgid, which arrived in the Smokies in the early 1960s. Thus, red spruce is now the dominant species in the range's spruce-fir forest. Large stands of dead Fraser firs remain atop Kuwohi and on the northwestern slopes of Old Black. While much of the red spruce stands were logged in the 1910s, the tree is still common throughout the range above 5,500 feet (1,700 m). Some of the red spruces are believed to be 300 years old, and the tallest rise to over 100 feet (30 m).

The main difference between the Southern Appalachian spruce–fir forest and the spruce-fir forests in northern latitudes is the dense broad-leaved understory of the former, which are home to catawba rhododendron, mountain ash, pin cherry, thornless blackberry, and hobblebush. The herbaceous and litter layers are poorly lit year-round and are thus dominated by shade-tolerant plants such as ferns, namely mountain wood fern and northern lady fern, and over 280 species of mosses.

=== Wildflowers ===
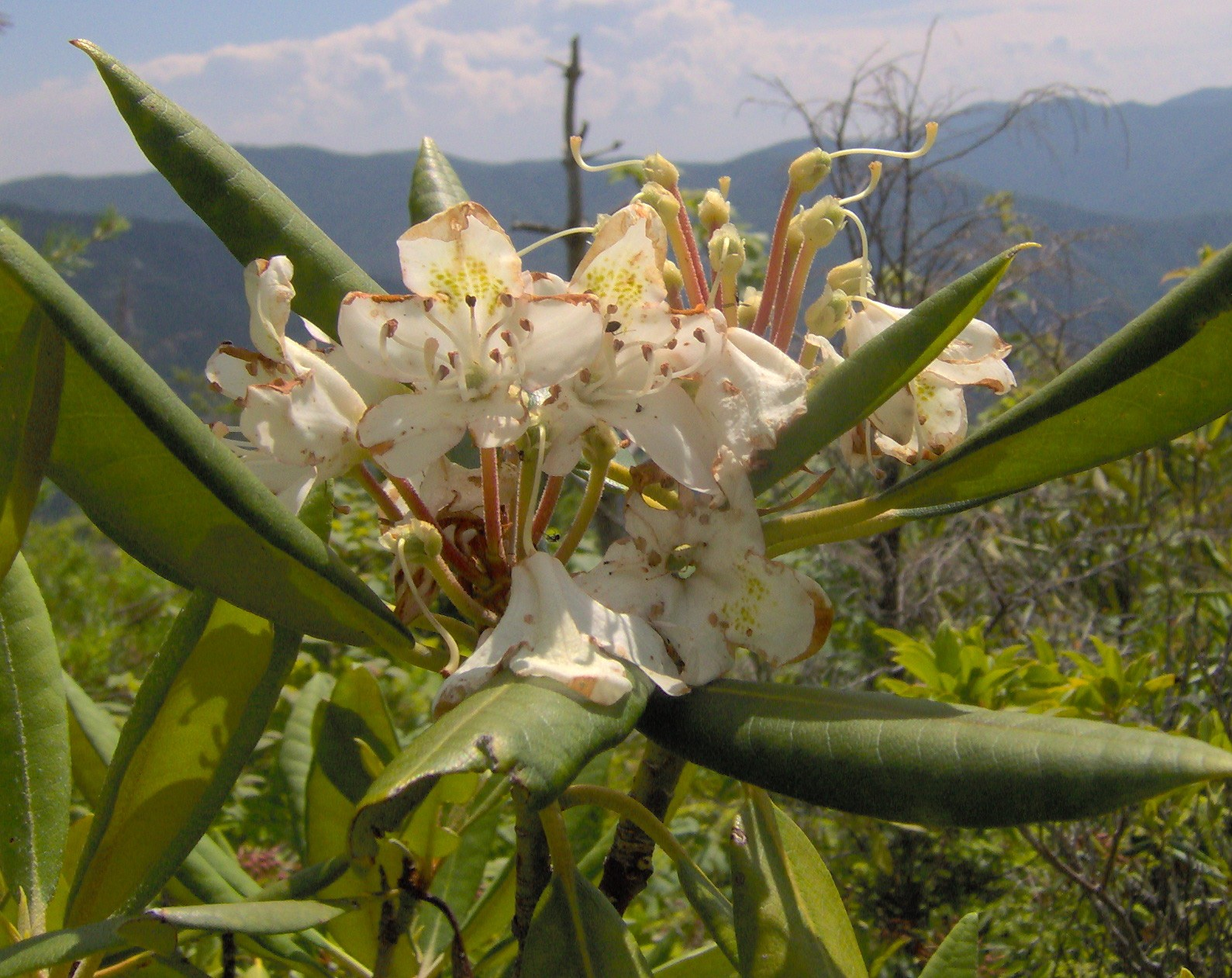
Rhododendron atop the Ben Parton Lookout

Many wildflowers grow in mountains and valleys, including bee balm, Solomon's seal, Dutchman's breeches, various trilliums, the Dragon's Advocate and even hardy orchids. There are two native species of rhododendron in the area. The catawba rhododendron has purple flowers in May and June, while the rosebay rhododendron has longer leaves and white or light pink blooms in June and July.

The orange- to sometimes red-flowered and deciduous flame azalea closely follows along with the catawbas. The closely related mountain laurel blooms in between the two, and all of the blooms progress from lower to higher elevations. The reverse is true in autumn, when nearly bare mountaintops covered in rime ice (frozen fog) can be separated from green valleys by very bright and varied leaf colors. The rhododendrons are broadleafs, whose leaves droop in order to shed wet and heavy snows that come through the region during winter.

== Fauna ==
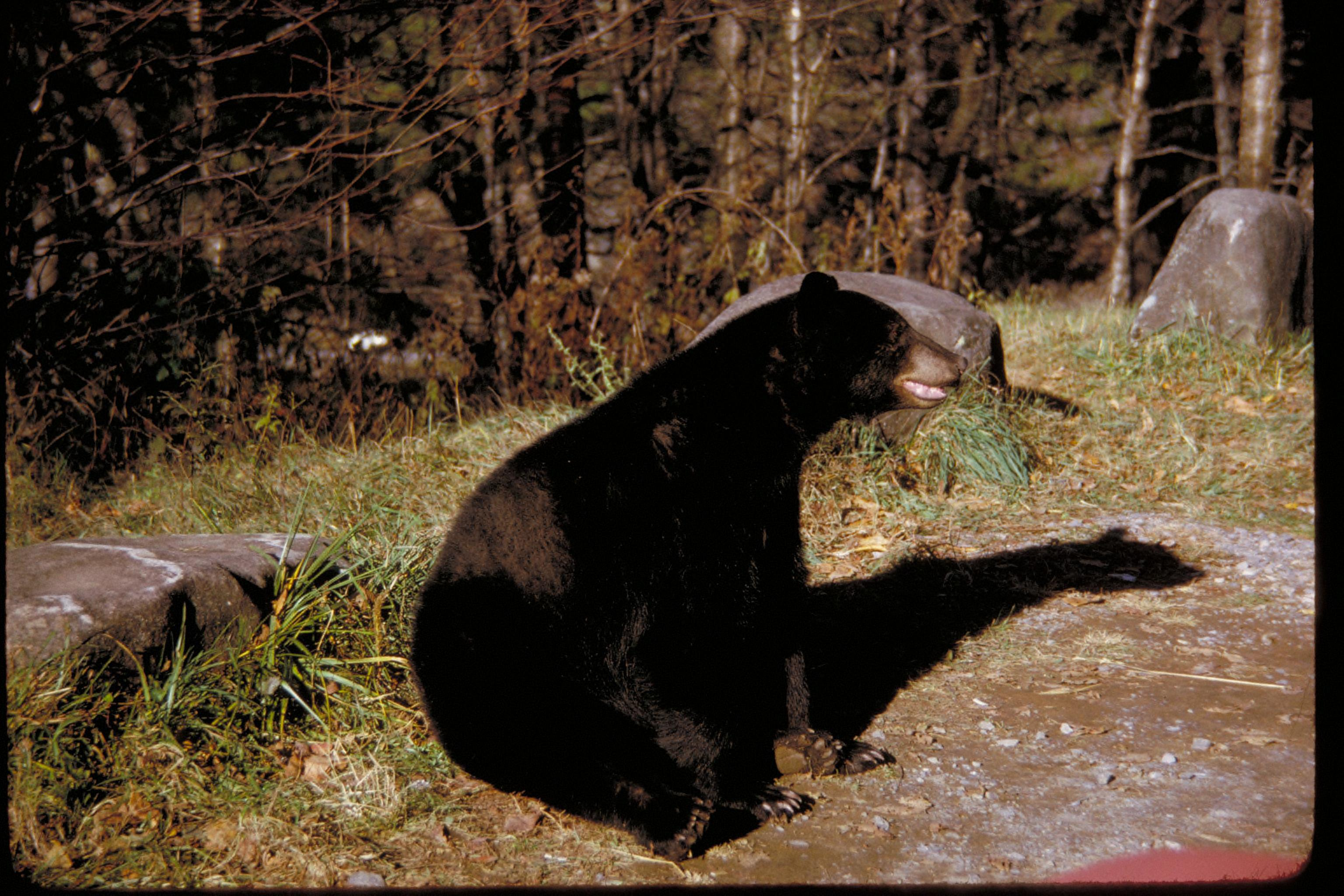
A black bear in the Great Smokies

The Great Smoky Mountains are home to 66 species of mammals, over 240 species of birds, 43 species of amphibians, 60 species of fish, and 40 species of reptiles. The range has the densest black bear population east of the Mississippi River. The black bear has come to symbolize wildlife in the Smokies, and the animal frequently appears on the covers of the Great Smoky Mountains National Park's literature. Most of the range's adult eastern black bears weigh between 100 and 300 pounds (45 and 136 kg), although some grow to more than 500 pounds (230 kg).

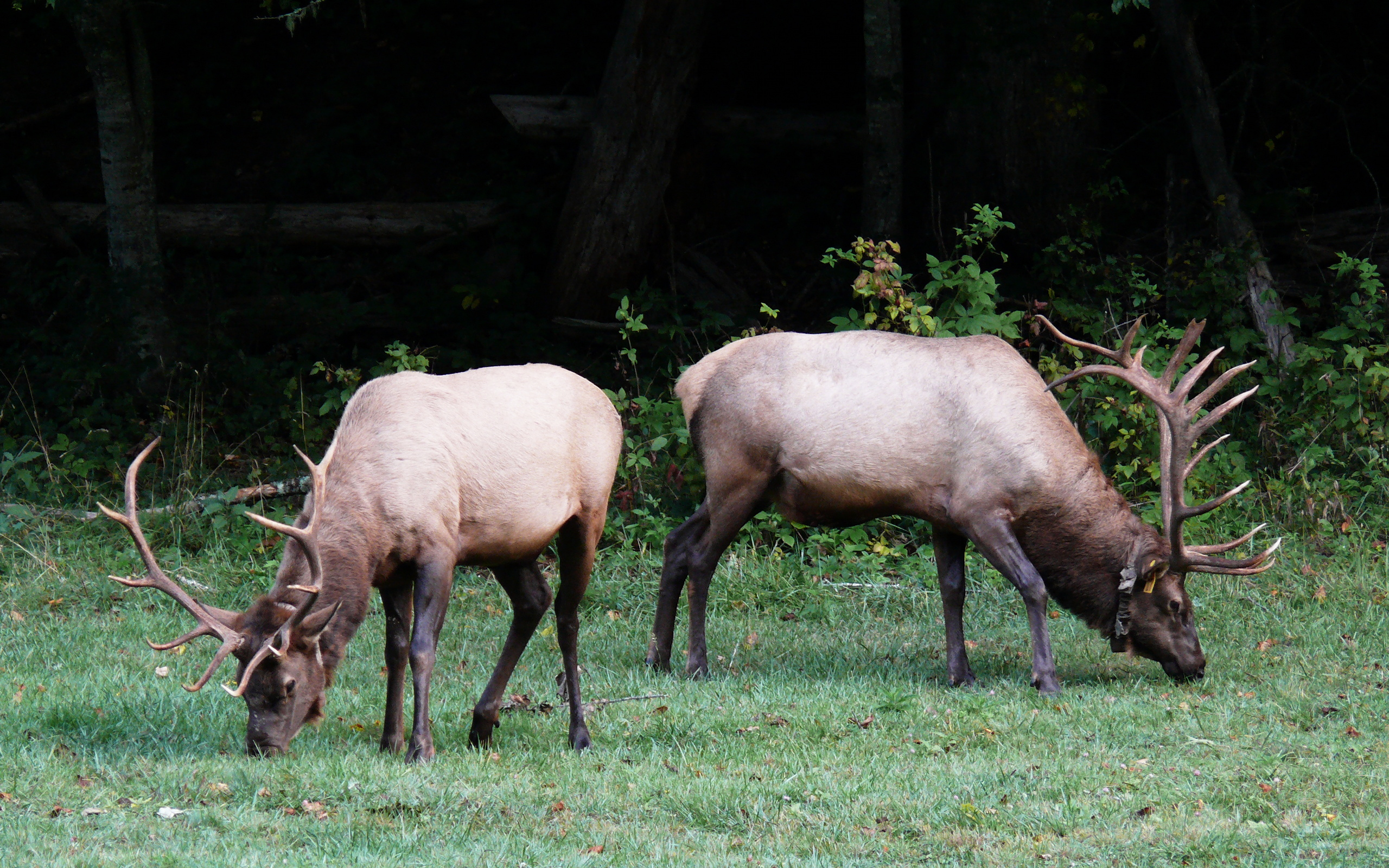
These elk are part of a herd which was transplanted to Cataloochee in 2001, in an attempt to reintroduce the species to the Appalachians in North Carolina

Other mammals include the white-tailed deer, the population of which drastically expanded with the creation of the national park. The bobcat is the only remaining wild cat species, although sightings of cougars, which once thrived in the area, are still occasionally reported. The coyote is not believed to be native to the range but has moved into the area in recent years and is treated as a native species. Two species of fox (red fox and the gray fox) are found within the Smokies, with red foxes being documented at all elevations.

European boar, introduced as game animals in the early 20th century, thrive in southern Appalachia but are considered a nuisance because of their tendency to root up and destroy plants. The boars are seen as taking food resources away from bears as well, and the park service has sponsored a program that pays individuals to hunt and kill boars and leave their bodies in locations frequented by bears.

The Smokies are home to over two dozen species of rodents, including the endangered northern flying squirrel and 10 species of bats, including the endangered Indiana bat. The National Park Service has successfully reintroduced river otters and elk. An attempt to reintroduce the red wolf in the early 1990s ultimately failed. These wolves were removed from the park and relocated to the Alligator River National Wildlife Refuge in North Carolina.

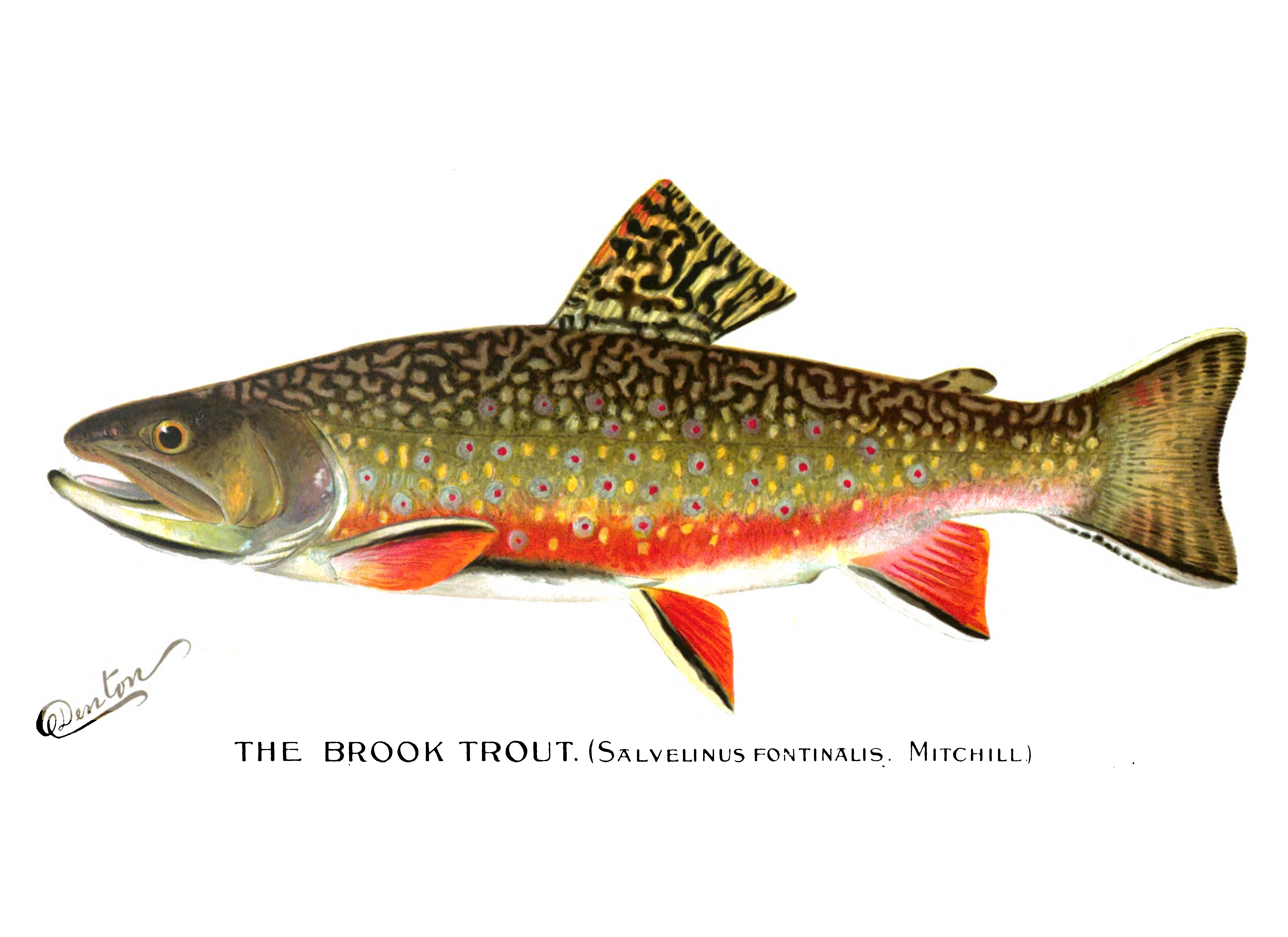
Brook trout are native to the Great Smoky Mountains.

The Smokies are home to a diverse bird population due to the presence of multiple forest types. Species that thrive in southern hardwood forests, such as the red-eyed vireo, wood thrush, wild turkey, northern parula, ruby-throated hummingbird, and tufted titmouse, are found throughout the lower elevations and cove hardwood forests. Species more typical of cooler climates, such as the raven, winter wren, black-capped chickadee, yellow-bellied sapsucker, dark-eyed junco, and Blackburnian, chestnut-sided, and Canada warblers, are found in the spruce-fir and northern hardwood zones.

Ovenbirds, whip-poor-wills, and downy woodpeckers live in the drier pine-oak forests and heath balds. Bald eagles and golden eagles have been spotted at all elevations in the park. Peregrine falcon sightings are also not uncommon, and a peregrine falcon eyrie is known to have existed near Alum Cave Bluffs throughout the 1930s. Red-tailed hawks, the most common hawk species, have been sighted at all elevations. Owl species include the barred owl, eastern screech owl, and northern saw-whet owl.

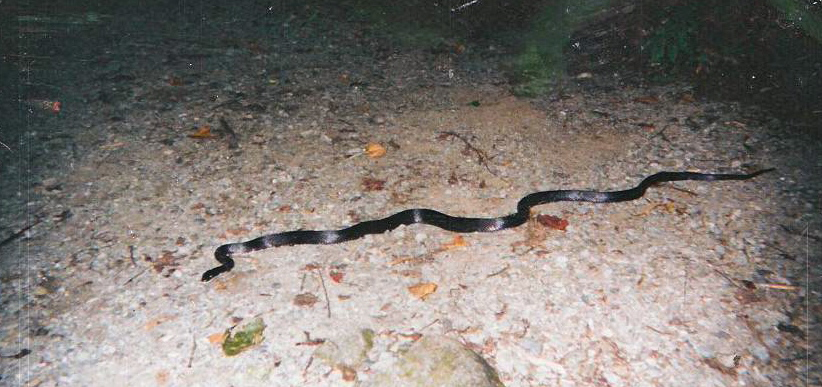
A black rat snake on a trail near Greenbriar

The timber rattlesnake, one of two venomous snake species in the Smokies, is found at all elevations. The other venomous snake, the copperhead, is typically found at lower elevations. Other reptiles include the eastern box turtle, the eastern fence lizard, the black rat snake, and the northern water snake.

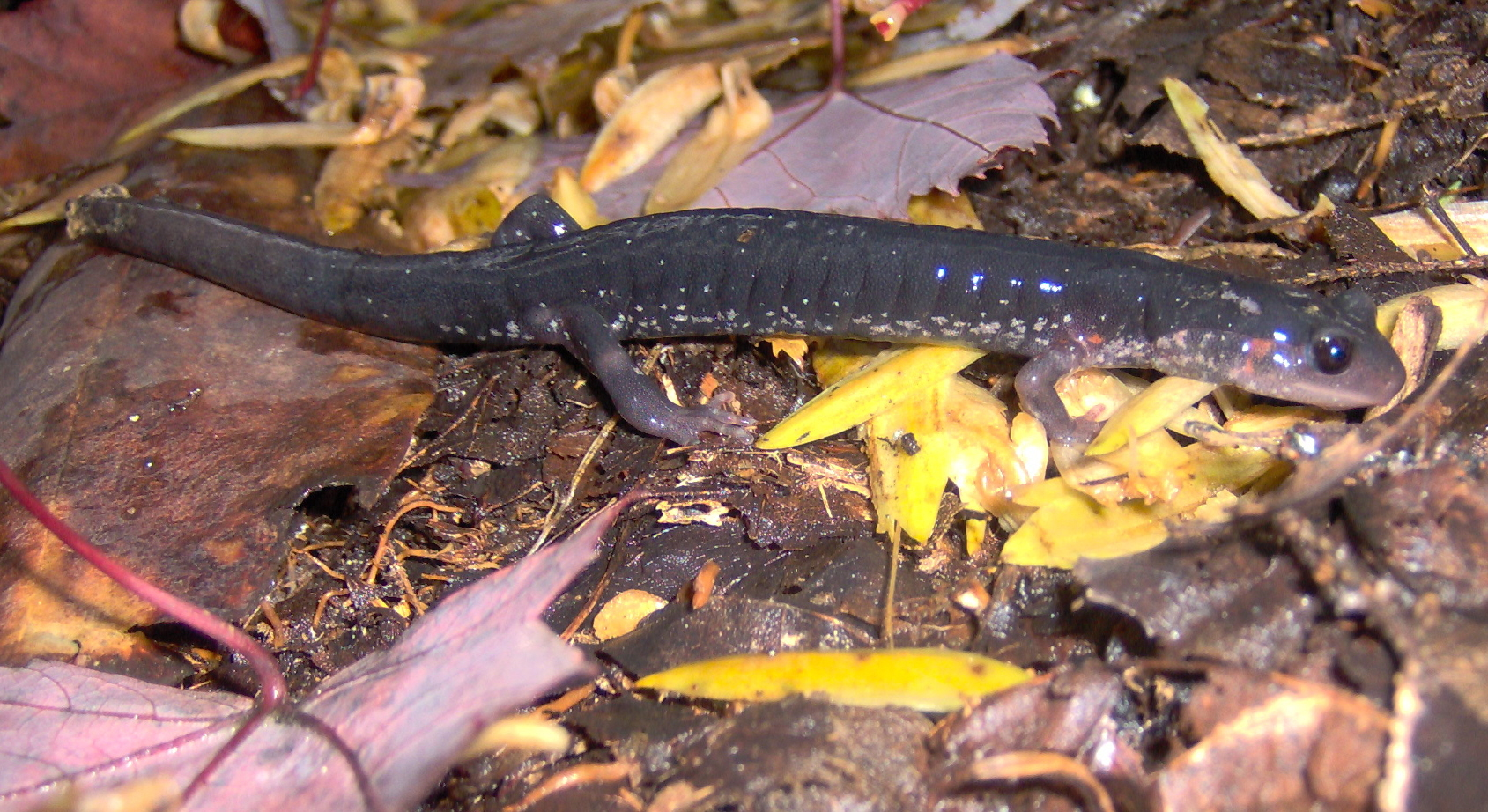
A redcheeked salamander

The Smokies are home to one of the world's most diverse salamander populations. Five of the world's nine families of salamanders are found in the range, consisting of up to 31 species. The red-cheeked salamander is found only in the Smokies. The imitator salamander is found only in the Smokies and the nearby Plott Balsams and Great Balsam Mountains. Two other species—the southern gray-cheeked salamander and the southern Appalachian salamander—occur only in the general region. Other species include the shovelnose salamander, blackbelly salamander, eastern red-spotted newt, and spotted dusky salamander. The hellbender inhabits swift streams. Other amphibians include the American toad and the American bullfrog, wood frog, upland chorus frog, northern green frog, and spring peeper.

Fish include trout, lamprey, darter, shiner, bass, and sucker. The brook trout is the only trout species native to the range, although northwestern rainbow trout and European brown trout were introduced in the first half of the 20th century. The larger rainbow and brown trout outcompete the native brook trout for food and habitat at lower elevations. As such, most of the brook trout found in the park today are in streams above 3,000 feet in elevation. Trout generally smaller than in different locales. Protected fish species include the smoky madtom and yellowfin madtom, the spotfin chub, and the duskytail darter.

The firefly Photinus carolinus, whose synchronized flashing light displays occur in mid-June, is native to the Smoky Mountains with a population epicenter near Elkmont, Tennessee.

== Ecosystem threats ==
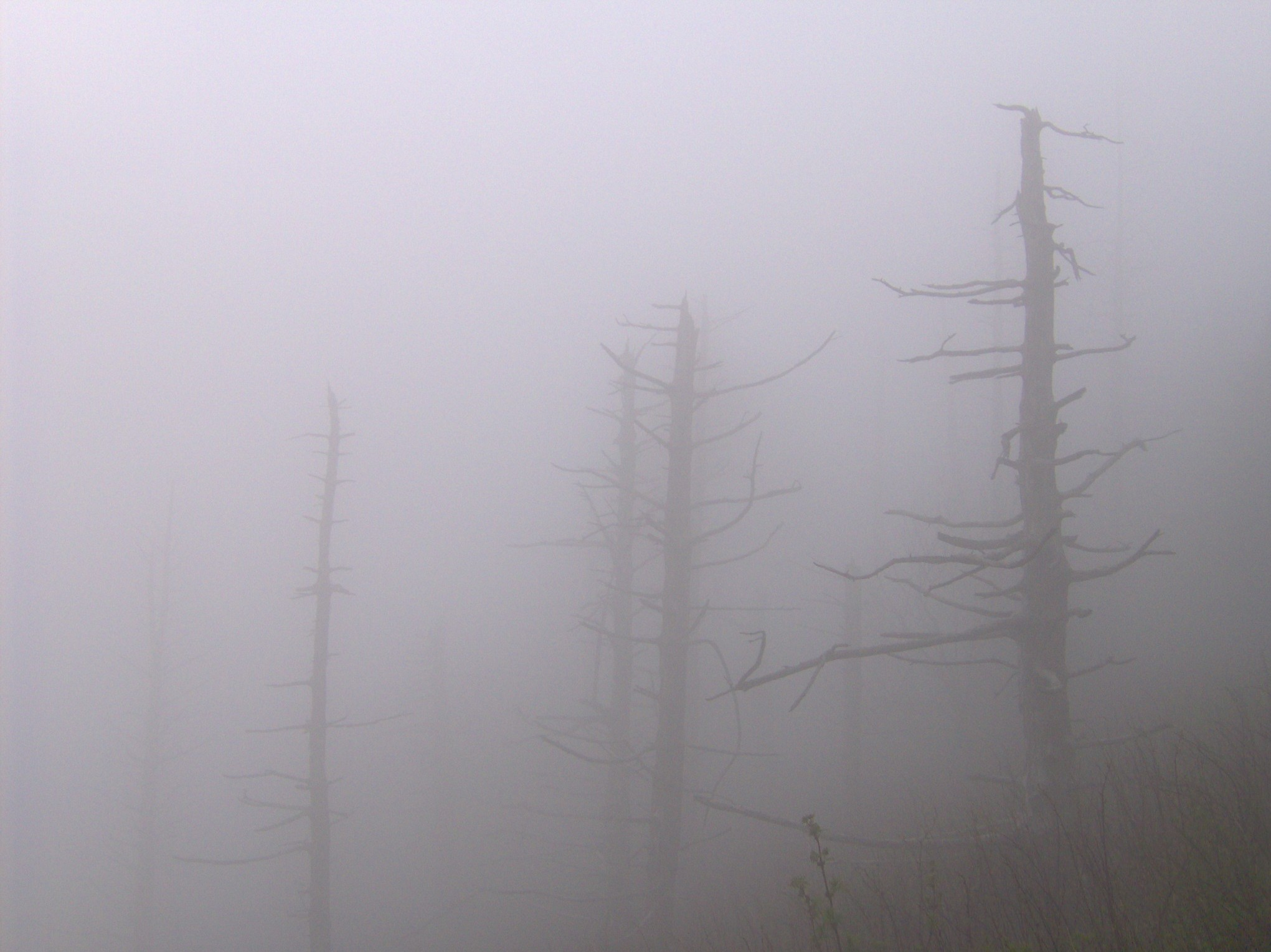
Dead Fraser firs on the slopes of Old Black

Air pollution is contributing to increased red spruce tree mortality at higher elevations and oak decline at lower elevations, while invasive hemlock woolly adelgids attack hemlocks, and balsam woolly adelgids attack Fraser firs. Pseudoscymnus tsugae, a type of beetle in the ladybug family, Coccinellidae, has been introduced in an attempt to control the pests.

Visibility is dramatically reduced by smog from both the Southeastern United States and the Midwest, and smog forecasts are prepared daily by the Environmental Protection Agency for both nearby Knoxville, Tennessee and Asheville, North Carolina.

Environmental threats are the concern of many non-profit environmental stewardship groups, especially The Friends of the Smokies. Formed in 1993, the group assists the National Park Service in its mission to preserve and protect the Great Smoky Mountains National Park by raising funds and public awareness, and providing volunteers for needed projects.

== History ==
=== Prehistory ===
Native Americans have likely been hunting in the Great Smoky Mountains for 14,000 years. Numerous Archaic period (c. 8000–1000 B.C.) artifacts have been found within the national park's boundaries, including projectile points uncovered along likely animal migration paths. Woodland period (c. 1000 B.C. - 1000 A.D.) sites found within the park contained 2,000-year-old ceramics and evidence of primitive agriculture.

The increasing reliance upon agriculture during the Mississippian period (c. 900–1600 A.D.) lured Native Americans away from the game-rich forests of the Smokies and into the fertile river valleys on the outer fringe of the range. Substantial Mississippian-period villages were uncovered at Citico and Toqua (named after the Cherokee villages that later thrived at these sites) along the Little Tennessee River in the 1960s. Fortified Mississippian-period villages have been excavated at the McMahan Indian Mounds in Sevierville and as well as mounds in Townsend.

Most of these villages were part of a minor chiefdom centered on a large village known as Chiaha, which was located on an island now submerged by Douglas Lake. The 1540 expedition of Hernando de Soto and the 1567 expedition of Juan Pardo passed through the French Broad River valley north of the Smokies, both spending a considerable amount of time at Chiaha. The Pardo expedition followed a trail across the flanks of Chilhowee Mountain to the Mississippian-period villages at Chilhowee and Citico (Pardo's notary called them by their Muskogean names, "Chalahume" and "Satapo").

=== Cherokee ===
By the time the first English explorers arrived in southern Appalachia in the late 17th century, the Cherokee controlled much of the region, and the Great Smoky Mountains lay at the center of their territory. One Cherokee legend tells of a magical lake hidden deep within the range but inaccessible to humans. Another tells of a captured Shawnee medicine man named Aganunitsi who, in exchange for his freedom, travels to the remote sections of the range in search of the Uktena. The Cherokee called Gregory Bald Tsitsuyi ᏥᏧᏱ, or "rabbit place," and believed the mountain to be the domain of the Great Rabbit. Other Cherokee place names in the Smokies included Duniskwalgunyi ᏚᏂᏍᏆᎫᏂ, or "forked antlers", which refers to the Chimney Tops, and kuwahi ᎫᏩᎯ, or "mulberry place".

Most Cherokee settlements were located in the river valleys on the outer fringe of the Smokies, which along with the Unicoi Mountains provided the main bulwark dividing the Overhill Cherokee villages in modern Tennessee from the Cherokee Middle towns in modern North Carolina. The Overhill town of Chilhowee was situated at the confluence of Abrams Creek and the Little Tennessee, and the Overhill town of Tallassee was located just a few miles upstream near modern Calderwood (both village sites are now under Chilhowee Lake). A string of Overhill villages, including Chota and Tanasi, dotted the Little Tennessee valley north of Chilhowee.

The Cherokee Middle towns included the village of Kittowa (which the Cherokee believed to be their oldest village) along the Tuckasegee River near Bryson City. The village of Oconaluftee, which was situated along the Oconaluftee River near the modern Oconaluftee Visitor Center, was the only known permanent Cherokee village located within the national park's boundaries. Sporadic or seasonal settlements were located in Cades Cove and the Hazel Creek valley.

=== European settlement ===
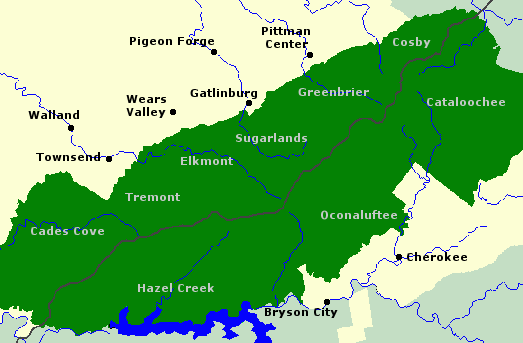
Communities past and present of the Great Smoky Mountains. The green areas denote the modern national park.

European explorers and settlers began arriving in Western North Carolina and East Tennessee in the mid-18th century. The influx of settlers at the end of the French and Indian War brought conflict with the Cherokee, who still held legal title to much of the land. When the Cherokee aligned themselves with the British at the outbreak of the American Revolution in 1776, American forces launched an invasion of Cherokee territory.

The Middle towns, including Kittuwa, were burned by General Griffith Rutherford, and several of the Overhill towns were burned by John Sevier. By 1805, the Cherokee had ceded control of the Smokies to the U.S. government. Although much of the tribe was forced west along the Trail of Tears in 1838, a few—largely through the efforts of William Holland Thomas—managed to retain their land on the Qualla Boundary and today comprise the Eastern Band of Cherokee Indians.

In the 1780s, several frontier outposts had been established along the outskirts of the Smokies, namely Whitson's Fort in what is now Cosby and Wear's Fort in what is now Pigeon Forge. Permanent settlers began arriving in these areas in the 1790s. In 1801, the Whaley brothers, William and John, moved from North Carolina to become the first settlers in what is now the Greenbrier section of the park.

In 1802, Edgefield, South Carolina resident William Ogle arrived in White Oak Flats where he cut and prepared logs for cabin construction. Although Ogle died shortly after returning to Edgefield, his wife, Martha Jane Huskey, eventually returned with her family and several other families to White Oak Flats, becoming the first permanent settlers in what would eventually become Gatlinburg. Their children and grandchildren spread out southward into the Sugarlands and Roaring Fork areas.

Cades Cove was settled largely by families who had purchased lots from land speculator William "Fighting Billy" Tipton. The first of these settlers, John and Lucretia Oliver, arrived in 1818. Two Cades Cove settlers, Moses and Patience Proctor, crossed over to the North Carolina side of the Smokies in 1836 to become the first Euro-American settlers in the Hazel Creek area. The Cataloochee area was first settled by the Caldwell family, who migrated to the valley in 1834.

Like most of southern Appalachia, the early 19th-century economy of the Smokies relied on subsistence agriculture. The average farm consisted of roughly 50 acres (0.20 km^{2}), part of which was cultivated and part of which was woodland. Early settlers lived in 16 by 20 feet (4.9 m × 6.1 m) log cabins, although these were replaced by more elaborate log houses and eventually, as lumber became available, by modern frame houses. Most farms included at least one barn, a springhouse (used for refrigeration), a smokehouse (used for curing meat), a chicken coop (protected chickens from predators), and a corn crib (kept corn dry and protected it from rodents). Some of the more industrious farmers operated gristmills, general stores, and sorghum presses. Religion was a central theme in the lives of the early residents of the Smokies, and community life was typically centered on churches. Christian Protestantism—especially Primitive Baptists, Missionary Baptists, Methodists, and Presbyterians; dominated the religious culture of the region.

=== American Civil War ===
While both Tennessee and North Carolina joined the Confederacy at the outbreak of the American Civil War in 1861, Union sentiment in the Great Smoky Mountains was much stronger relative to other regions in these two states. Generally, the communities on the Tennessee side of the Smokies supported the Union, while communities on the North Carolina side supported the Confederates. On the Tennessee side, 74% of Cocke Countians, 80% of Blount Countians, and 96% of Sevier Countians voted against secession. In the North Carolina Smokies—Cherokee, Haywood, Jackson, and Macon counties—about 46% of the population favored secession.

While no major engagements took place in the Smokies, minor skirmishes were fairly common. Cherokee chief William Holland Thomas formed a Confederate legion made up mostly of Cherokee soldiers. Thomas' Legion crossed the Smokies in 1862 and occupied Gatlinburg for several months to protect saltpeter mines atop Mount Le Conte. Residents of predominantly Union Cades Cove and predominantly Confederate Hazel Creek routinely crossed the mountains to steal one another's livestock. Residents of Cosby and Cataloochee did likewise. One notable Civil War incident was the murder of long-time Cades Cove resident Russell Gregory (for whom Gregory Bald is named), which was carried out by bushwhackers in 1864 shortly after Gregory had led an ambush that routed a band of Confederates seeking to wreak havoc in the cove. Another incident was George Kirk's raid on Cataloochee, in which Kirk killed or wounded 15 Union soldiers recovering at a makeshift hospital.

=== Logging ===
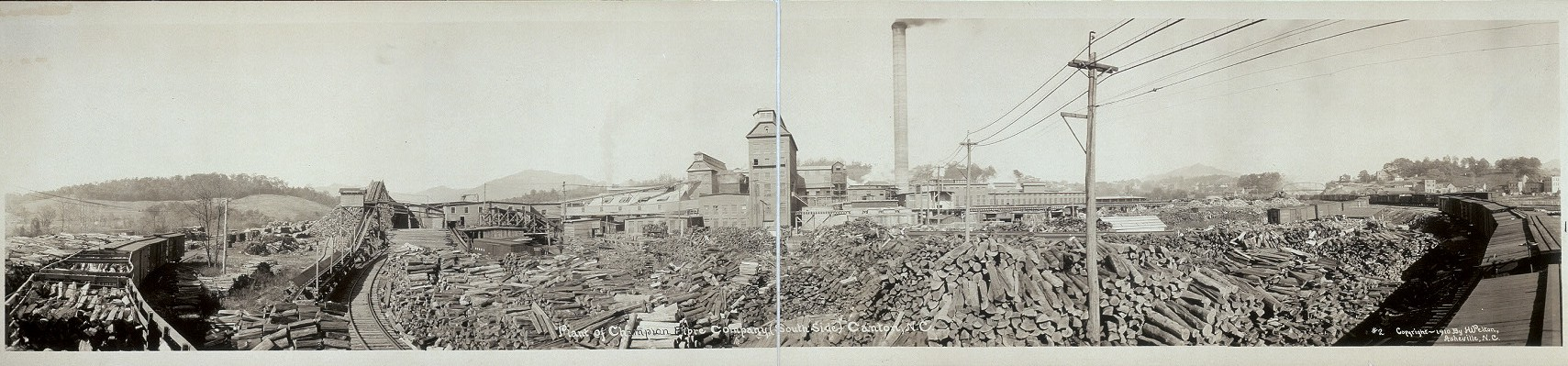
The Champion Fibre Company plant in Canton, North Carolina, 1910

While selective logging occurred in the Great Smoky Mountains throughout the 19th century, the general inaccessibility of the forests prevented major logging operations, and lumber firms relied on the lowland forests in the northeastern United States and the Mississippi Delta in the southeast. As timber resources in these regions became exhausted, and as the demand for lumber skyrocketed after the Civil War, entrepreneurs began looking for ways to reach the virgin forests of southern Appalachia. The first logging operations in the Smokies, which began in the 1880s, used splash dams or booms to float logs down rivers to lumber mills in nearby cities. Notable splash dam and boom operations included the English Lumber Company on Little River, the Taylor and Crate operations along Hazel Creek, and the ambitious operations of Alexander Arthur on the Pigeon River. All three of these operations failed within their first few years, however, after their dams and boom systems were destroyed by floods.

Innovations in logging railroads and band saw technology in the late 19th century made large-scale logging possible in the mountainous areas of southern Appalachia. The largest logging operation in the Smokies was the Little River Lumber Company, which logged the Little River watershed between 1901 and 1939. The company also established company towns at Townsend (named for the company's chief owner and manager, Wilson B. Townsend), Elkmont, and Tremont.

The second-largest operation was the Ritter Lumber Company, which logged the Hazel Creek watershed between 1907 and 1928. Ruins of Ritter's lumbering operations are still visible along the Hazel Creek Trail. Other lumbering operations included Three M Lumber and Champion Fibre, both of which logged the Oconaluftee watershed. By the time all operations ceased in the 1930s, logging firms had removed two-thirds of the virgin forests from the Smokies. According to the National Park Service, 80% of the Smokies was clear cut in the early 20th century.

=== National park ===
Wilson B. Townsend, the head of Little River Lumber, began advertising Elkmont as a tourist destination in 1909. Within a few years, the Wonderland Hotel and the Appalachian Club had been established to cater to elite Knoxvillians seeking summer mountain getaways. In the early 1920s, several Appalachian Club members, among them Knoxville businessman Colonel David Chapman, began seriously considering a movement to establish a national park in the Smokies. As head of the Great Smoky Mountains Park Commission, Chapman was largely responsible for raising funds for land purchases and coordinating park efforts between local, state, and federal entities.

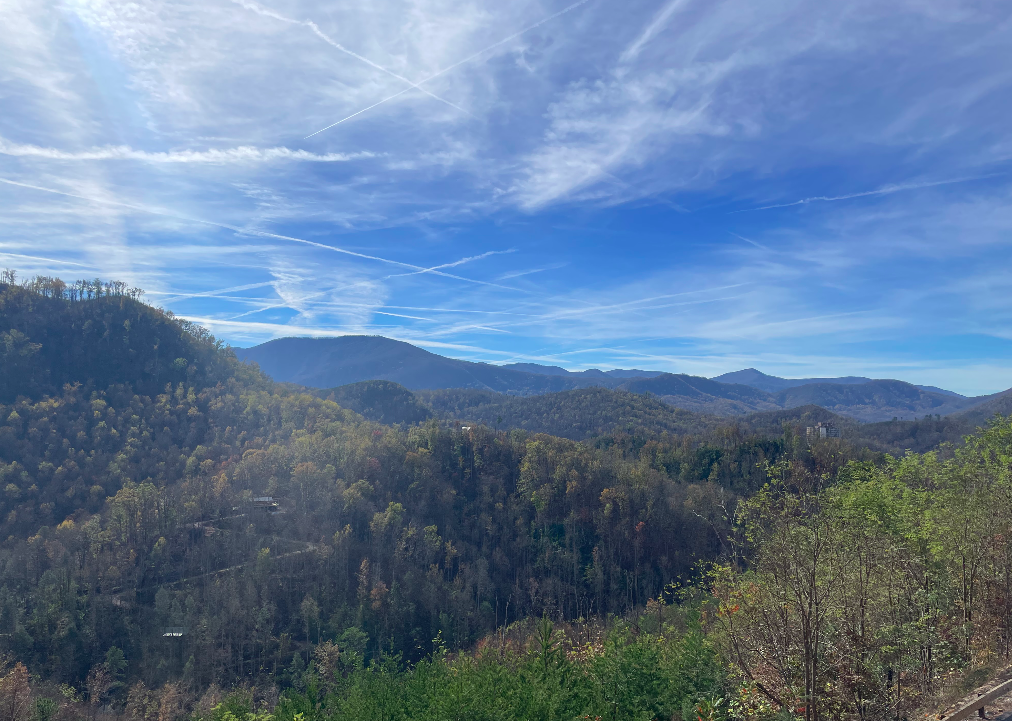
View of the Great Smoky Mountains National Park from AnaVista Tower at Anakeesta

The creation of the Great Smoky Mountains National Park proved much more complex than the creation of its predecessors, such as Yellowstone and Yosemite, which were already federally owned. Along with convincing logging firms to sell lucrative lumber rights, the Park Commission had to negotiate the purchase of thousands of small farms and remove entire communities. The commission also had to deal with the Tennessee and North Carolina legislatures, which at times were opposed to spending taxpayer money on park efforts. In spite of these difficulties, the Park Commission had completed most major land purchases by 1932. The national park officially opened in 1934, with President Franklin D. Roosevelt presiding over the opening ceremony at Newfound Gap.

== Culture and tourism ==
The Great Smoky Mountains National Park in autumn

The culture of the area is that of southern Appalachia, and previously the Cherokee people. Tourism is key to the area's economy, particularly in cities like Pigeon Forge, Gatlinburg, and Cherokee. In 2006, the Great Smoky Mountains Heritage Center opened in Townsend with the mission of preserving various aspects of the region's culture. The Knoxville Smokies baseball team is named for the mountain range.

The Great Smoky Mountains are home to The Gatlinburg SkyLift and SkyBridge.

== See also ==
- List of subranges of the Appalachian Mountains
- Dollywood – Theme park in Pigeon Forge, Tennessee, US
