= Mount Harrison =

Mount Harrison can refer to:

- Mount Harrison (Antarctica)
- Mount Harrison (British Columbia), Canada; see List of the most prominent summits of Canada
- Mount Harrison (Yukon), Canada; see List of the most prominent summits of Canada
- Mount Harrison (Idaho), U.S.
- Mount Harrison, one of the seven hills of Cincinnati, Ohio, U.S.
- Mount Harrison, Tennessee; see Ober Gatlinburg

== See also ==
- Mount Hardison
