= List of historical structures maintained by the Great Smoky Mountains National Park =

The following is a comprehensive list of historical structures located within and maintained by the Great Smoky Mountains National Park. Structures at Cades Cove, Roaring Fork, the Noah Ogle Place, and Elkmont are part of U.S. Registered Historic Districts. Nine individual structures in the park are listed on the National Register of Historic Places. All historic structures within the park are maintained under NRHP guidelines, whether they are listed or not.

== Cades Cove ==
Structure	Image	Date of construction	Access	Notes
John Oliver Cabin		1822	Cades Cove Loop Rd.	Oldest standing structure in the park
Cades Cove Primitive Baptist Church		1887	Cades Cove Loop Rd.	
Cades Cove Methodist Church		1902	Cades Cove Loop Rd.	
Cades Cove Missionary Baptist Church		1915	Cades Cove Loop Rd.	
Myers Barn		1920	Cades Cove Loop Rd.	
Elijah Oliver Cabin		1866	Cades Cove Loop Rd./short trail	"dog-trot" style cabin with detached kitchen
Elijah Oliver stable		c. 1866	Cades Cove Loop Rd./short trail	
Elijah Oliver corn crib		c. 1866	Cades Cove Loop Rd./short trail	
Elijah Oliver chicken coop		c. 1866	Cades Cove Loop Rd./short trail	
Becky Cable House		1879	Cades Cove Loop Rd.	Built and originally used by Leeson Gregg as a store
John Cable Gristmill		1868	Cades Cove Loop Rd.	The mill's overshot wheel is popular with photographers
Cades Cove Museum Barn			Cades Cove Loop Rd.	Moved from original location
Cades Cove Museum chicken coop			Cades Cove Loop Rd.	Moved from original location
Cades Cove Museum Smokehouse			Cades Cove Loop Rd.	Moved from original location
Cades Cove Museum corn crib			Cades Cove Loop Rd.	Moved from original location
Cades Cove Museum Molasses still			Cades Cove Loop Rd.	Moved from original location
Henry Whitehead Cabin		1896	Forge Creek Rd.	
Dan Lawson Cabin		1855	Cades Cove Loop Rd.	Built by Lawson's father-in-law, Peter Cable
Dan Lawson Smokehouse			Cades Cove Loop Rd.	
Dan Lawson Chicken Coop			Cades Cove Loop Rd.	
Dan Lawson Barn			Cades Cove Loop Rd.	
Tipton Cabin		1870s	Cades Cove Loop Rd.	Sometimes called the Tipton-Oliver Place
Tipton Barn		1968	Cades Cove Loop Rd.	Oft-photographed double-cantilever barn; based on original design
Tipton Corncrib			Cades Cove Loop Rd.	
Tipton Oliver Blacksmith Shop			Cades Cove Loop Rd.	
Tipton Smokehouse			Cades Cove Loop Rd.	Low building on cabin's front lawn
Carter Shields Cabin		1880s	Cades Cove Loop Rd.	

== Elkmont ==
Structure	Image	Appx. date of construction	Access	Notes
Mayna Avent Cabin		1850	Jakes Creek Trail/side trail	Built by Ownby family, used as a studio by Mayna Avent in the 1920s
Appalachian Clubhouse		1934	Elkmont Road	Replaced earlier clubhouse at the site, which burned in 1932
Sneed Cabin		1910	Elkmont Road	Log walls chinked with grout; kitchen added 1948
Smith Cabin		1910	Elkmont Road	Porch added in the 1970s
Higdon Cabin		1910	Elkmont Road	Porch added in 1980
Swan Cabin		1910–1930	Elkmont Road	Remodeled numerous times
Addicks Cabin		1910	Elkmont Road	Initially a "set house" used by Little River Lumber Company employees; rear wing added 1930s
Adamless Eden		1921	Elkmont Road	Children's playhouse on Addicks Cabin property; unhewn-log siding
Creekmore Cabin		1910–1930	Elkmont Road	Several additions in the 1970s and 1980s
Mayo Cabin		1910	Elkmont Road	Initially a "set house" used by Little River Lumber Company employees; rear wing added in the 1930s
Levi Trentham Cabin		1830	Elkmont Road	Originally located on upper Jakes Creek; moved to Mayo Cabin lot after Trentham's death in 1932
Mayo Cabin – servants' quarters		1920	Elkmont Road	Board and batten siding
Cain Cabin		1915	Elkmont Road	Remodeled numerous times
Galyon Cabin		1910–1919	Elkmont Road	Kitchen added 1919; associated shed built in 1970
Baumann Cabin		1910	Elkmont Road	Clerestory added in the 1920s; Rear wing added in 1936
Scruggs-Brisco Cabin		1910–1930	Elkmont Road	Porch added in 1970
Cook Cabin		1912	Elkmont Road	Several additions 1930–1950; porch added in 1970
Hale Cabin		1910–1930	Elkmont Road	Porch added in 1970
Byers Cabin		1910–1930	Elkmont Road ("Society Hill")	Given to Col. David Chapman by Tennessee Park Commission for his work in establishing the national park
Spence Cabin		1910–1930	Little River Trail	Also known as "River Lodge"; middle section built with unhewn logs, board-and-batten on east and west sections, weatherboarding on east section

== Cataloochee ==
Structure	Image	Appx. date of construction	Access	Notes
Hannah Cabin		1860s	Little Cataloochee Trail	Brick chimney
Cook Cabin		1850s	Little Cataloochee Trail	Dismantled in the 1970s after vandalism, restored in 1999
Palmer House		1869		Now used as a museum
Palmer Smokehouse				Located behind the Palmer House
Palmer Springhouse				Located behind the Palmer House
Palmer Barn				Located near the Palmer House
Palmer Chapel		1898		
Beech Grove School		1907		
Caldwell House		1898–1903		
Caldwell Barn		1923		
Steve Woody House		1880	Rough Fork Trail	Paneling added in the early 20th century
Steve Woody Springhouse			Rough Fork Trail	
Little Cataloochee Baptist Church		1889	Little Cataloochee Trail	Sometimes called the Ola Baptist Church
Will Messer Barn		1905		Moved from original location in Little Cataloochee

== Hazel Creek ==
Structure	Image	Appx. date of construction	Access	Notes
Granville Calhoun House		1920s	Hazel Creek Trail	Built by George Higdon, purchased by Calhoun in 1928
Hall Cabin		1892	Bone Valley Trail	The park's most remote historic structure

== Greenbrier ==
Structure	Image	Appx. date of construction	Access	Notes
John Messer Barn		1875	Porters Creek Trail	Built by Pinkney Whaley; double-cantilever barn
Smoky Mountain Hiking Club Cabin		1934	Porters Creek Trail	Built by SMHC using logs from a nearby Whaley cabin
Baxter Cabin		1889	Maddron Bald Trail	Sometimes called the "Jenkins Cabin" after a later owner

== Tyson McCarter Place ==
Structure	Image	Appx. date of construction	Access	Notes
Tyson McCarter Barn		circa 1876	Old Settlers Trail	
Tyson McCarter Springhouse		circa 1876	Old Settlers Trail	
Tyson McCarter Smokehouse		circa 1876	Old Settlers Trail	
Tyson McCarter Corncrib		circa 1876	Old Settlers Trail	adjoined to the Tyson McCarter barn

== The Sugarlands ==
Structure	Image	Appx. date of construction	Access	Notes
John Ownby Cabin		1850s	Sugarlands Visitor Center nature trail	

== Noah Ogle Place ==
Structure	Image	Appx. date of construction	Access	Notes
Noah "Bud" Ogle Cabin		Late 1880s	Cherokee Orchard Rd.	Two cabins sharing one chimney
Noah "Bud" Ogle Barn		Late 1880s	Cherokee Orchard Rd.	Located behind Noah Ogle Cabin
Noah "Bud" Ogle Tub Mill		1885	Noah Ogle Place nature trail	Still operational

== Roaring Fork ==
Structure	Image	Appx. date of construction	Access	Notes
Alex Cole Cabin		early 19th century	Roaring Fork Motor Nature Trail	Part of Jim Bales Place; moved from original location near Cole Cemetery
Jim Bales Barn		late 19th century	Roaring Fork Motor Nature Trail	Part of Jim Bales Place
Jim Bales Corncrib		late 19th century	Roaring Fork Motor Nature Trail	Part of Jim Bales Place
Ephraim Bales Cabin		late 19th century	Roaring Fork Motor Nature Trail	dog-trot double cabin
Ephraim Bales Corncrib		late 19th century	Roaring Fork Motor Nature Trail	located behind Ephraim Bales Cabin
Ephraim Bales Barn		late 19th century	Roaring Fork Motor Nature Trail	located behind Ephraim Bales Cabin
Ephraim Bales Hogpen			Roaring Fork Motor Nature Trail	located behind Ephraim Bales Cabin
Alfred Reagan Cabin		late 19th century	Roaring Fork Motor Nature Trail	Paneling and paint added in the early 20th century
Alfred Reagan Tubmill			Roaring Fork Motor Nature Trail	located across the street from Reagan's cabin

== Little Greenbrier ==
Structure	Image	Appx. date of construction	Access	Notes
Walker Cabin		1859	Little Greenbrier Trail	Sometimes called King-Walker Cabin
Walker Corncrib			Little Greenbrier Trail	Located adjacent to Walker Cabin
Walker Springhouse			Little Greenbrier Trail	Located near Walker Cabin
Little Greenbrier School		early 1880s	Little Greenbrier Trail	Constructed of hewn poplar logs

== Oconaluftee ==
Structure	Image	Appx. date of construction	Access	Notes
Mingus Mill		1886	just off US-441	Large three-story gristmill, still operational
Smokemont Baptist Church		early 20th century	Smokemont Campground Rd.	
John Davis Cabin		1900	Just off US-441	Originally located on Indian Creek; part of Mountain Farm Museum
Enloe Barn		c. 1880	Just off US-441	part of Mountain Farm Museum
Messer Applehouse			Just off US-441	Originally located in Cataloochee; part of Mountain Farm Museum
Baxter Chickenhouse		late 19th century	Just off US-441	Originally located at the Baxter Cabin near Greenbrier
Mountain Farm Museum Meathouse			Just off US-441	Originally located in Cataloochee
Mountain Farm Museum Blacksmith Shop		1900	Just off US-441	Originally located in Cades Cove
Mountain Farm Museum Springhouse			Just off US-441	Originally located in Cataloochee
Mountain Farm Museum Corncrib/Shed		c. 1900	Just off US-441	Originally located near Bryson City
Mountain Farm Museum Corncrib		c. 1900	Just off US-441	Originally located near Bryson City
Mountain Farm Museum Hogpen			Just off US-441	Originally located on Indian Creek

== Resources ==
- Davis, Hattie Caldwell. Cataloochee Valley: Vanished Settlements of the Great Smoky Mountains (Alexander, N.C.: Worldcomm, 1997).
- Dunn, Durwood. Cades Cove: The Life and Death of an Appalachian Community (Knoxville: University of Tennessee Press, 1988).
- Oliver, Duane. Hazel Creek From Then Till Now (Maryville, Tenn.: Stinnett Printing, 1989).
- Robbins, Tim. Mountain Farm Museum Self-Guided Tour (Gatlinburg: Great Smoky Mountains Association, date not given).
- Thomason, Phillip and Williams, Michael. National Register of Historic Places Registration Form for Elkmont Historic District. April–July 1993, pp. 8–19. PDF file.
- Trout, Ed. Historic Buildings of the Smokies (Gatlinburg: Great Smoky Mountains Association, 1995).
- Wear, Jerry. Greenbrier: Lost Communities of Sevier County, Tennessee (Sevierville, Tenn.: Sevierville Heritage Committee, 1985).
- Wear, Jerry. Sugarlands: A Lost Community in Sevier County, Tennessee (Sevierville, Tennessee: Sevierville Heritage Committee, 1986).
