= Trillium Gap Trail =

Trail in Tennessee, United States

Coordinates: 35.6802°N 83.4626°W

- Length: 6.5 mi (10.5 km)
- Location: Great Smoky Mountains National Park, Tennessee, United States
- Trailheads: Mount Le Conte, Tennessee (Trailhead off the Roaring Fork Motor Nature Trail, near Gatlinburg, Tennessee; Terminus near the LeConte Lodge
- Use: Hiking
- Elevation change: 3,200 ft (980 m)
- Highest point: Terminus near the LeConte Lodge
- Lowest point: Trailhead
- Difficulty: Moderately Strenuous
- Season: Spring to Fall
- Sights: Grotto Falls, Trillium Gap, Appalachian Mountains
- Hazards: Ice (in winter), loose rocks, dicey stream crossings

The Trillium Gap Trail is an American hiking trail in the Great Smoky Mountains National Park, in Sevier County, Tennessee. The trail ascends Mount Le Conte, one of the tallest (sixth highest) mountains east of the Mississippi River and passes both Grotto Falls and Trillium Gap before reaching the LeConte Lodge, near the summit. The trail to Grotto Falls is one of the busiest in the national park.

== Vital information ==
- The Trillium Gap Trail is one of the five trails leading to the Le Conte massif, which contains four separate peaks in all, the highest of which has an elevation of 6,593 feet (2,010 m).
- The trail is the only horse trail on Le Conte and is traveled three times a week by llamas transporting supplies to the LeConte Lodge, except during the winter season, when the lodge is temporarily closed.
- The trailhead is located inside of the Great Smoky Mountains National Park, about 7.5 miles (12.1 km) from the town of Gatlinburg, Tennessee, off the Roaring Fork Motor Nature Trail.

== Landmarks/overlooks ==
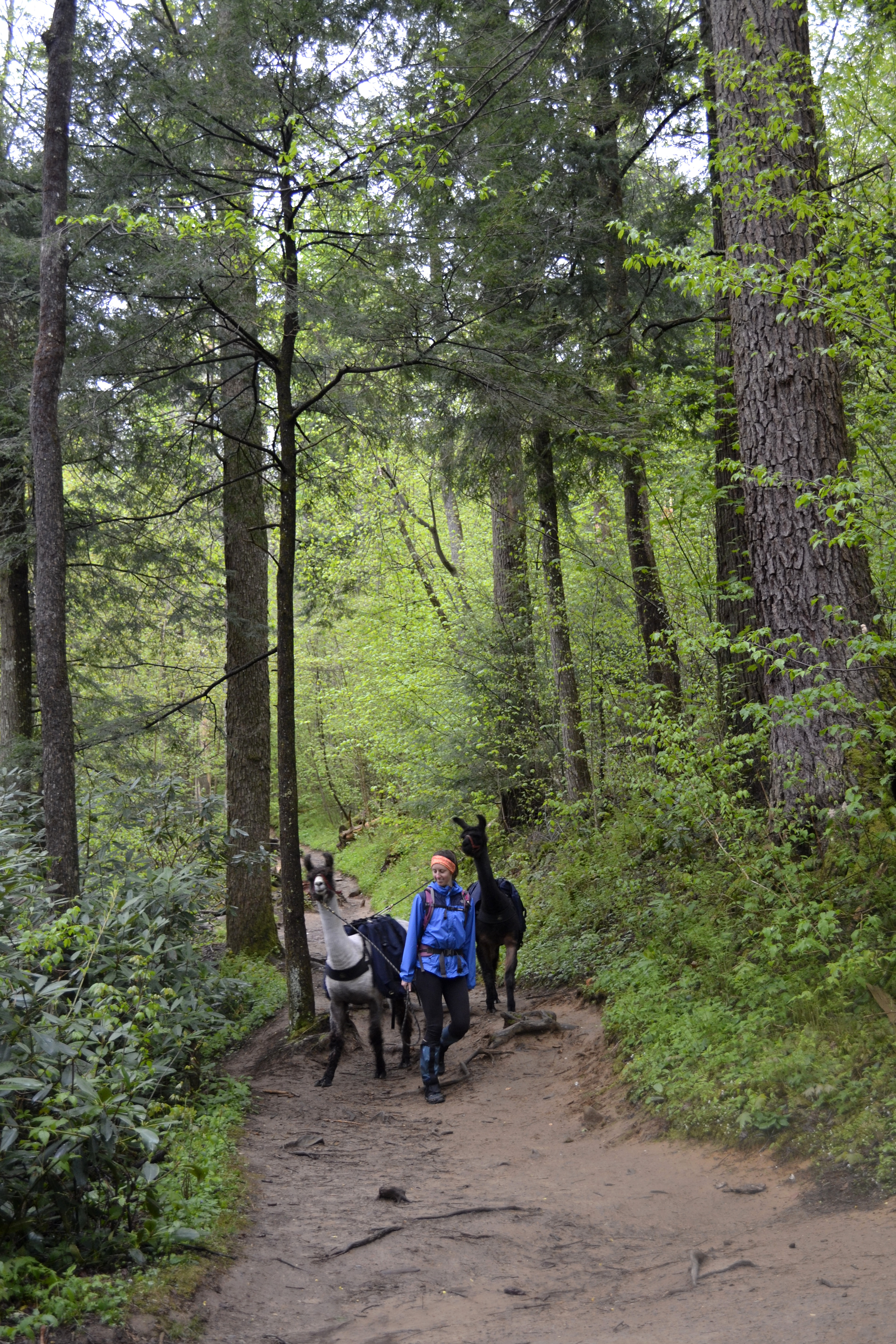
Llamas are used to resupply LeConte Lodge. The Trillium Gap Trail is the main route used.

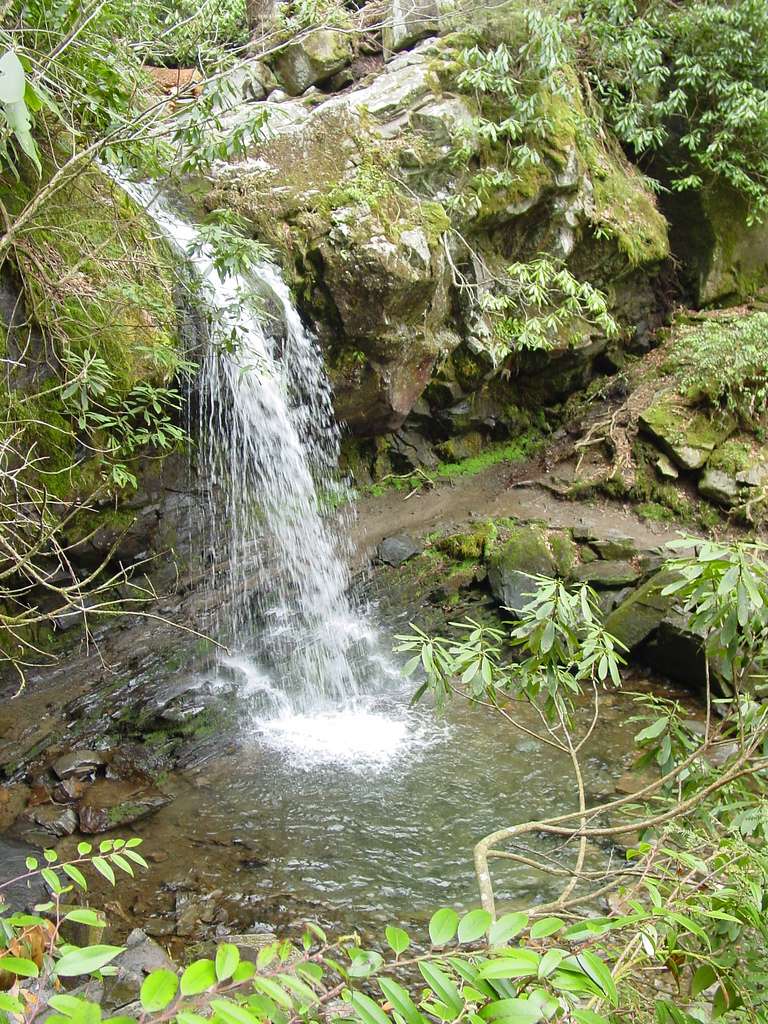
Grotto Falls

- Roaring Fork
- Grotto Falls
- Trillium Gap
- Brushy Mountain (0.4 mile spur trail from Trillium Gap)

== Trail synopsis ==
=== Trailhead to Grotto Falls ===
The Trillium Gap Trail begins its 6.5-mile (10.5 km) journey up the northern face of Mount Le Conte in an old-growth Eastern Hemlock grove, at an elevation close to 3,200 ft (975 m). Although very easy (only rising 500 feet (150 m) in elevation over the first 1.5 miles), this portion of the trail does contain many small creek crossings, so the hiker may want to brush up on his/her rock hopping skills prior to taking on the trail. After the third small stream, Roaring Fork sidles up along the path, signalling the soon-approaching Grotto Falls at 1.3 miles (2.1 km). Here Roaring Fork tumbles thirty feet (9 m) over the falls, which the trail actually passes behind on its way to Trillium Gap and points beyond. Grotto Falls is one of the most picturesque waterfalls in the park, and inasmuch can draw quite the crowd on certain days.

=== Grotto Falls to Trillium Gap ===
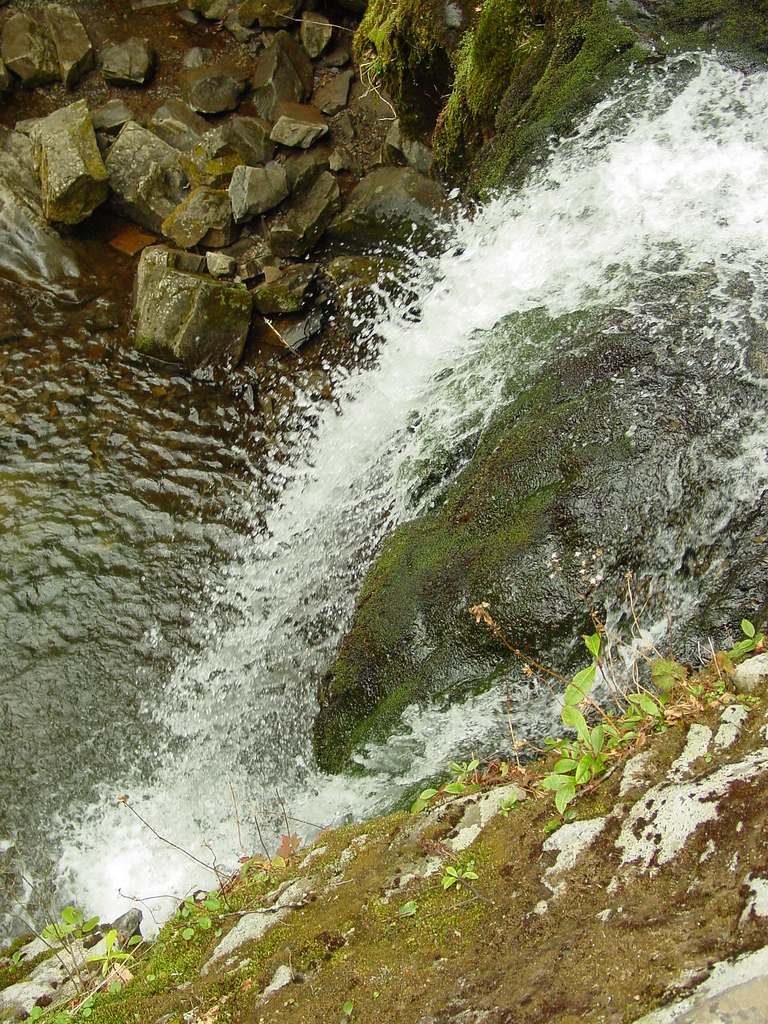
Grotto Falls, from above

Once the hiker crosses the Roaring Fork (particularly after heavy rains), he or she begins a more steady ascent towards Le Conte. The trail here becomes more narrow and progressively rockier, a combination of the gain in elevation and loss of heavy activity along the trail. About a mile past the falls, the path enters into an expansive boulder field, where yet another small creek plummets down towards Roaring Fork. At 2.9 miles (4.7 km) the trail comes to Trillium Gap, tucked snugly between the peaks of Le Conte and nearby Brushy Mountain. Springtime hikers will be delighted by the carpeting of wildflowers underneath the American beech grove. The Brushy Mountain Trail extends to the left of the gap, which, if taken less than a half mile, offers excellent views of Le Conte and even the towns of Pigeon Forge and Sevierville from Brushy Mountain.

=== Trillium Gap to the LeConte Lodge ===
After leaving Trillium Gap, the trail continues climbing for 3.6 miles (5.8 km) towards its terminus. Along the way the hiker passes through a heath bald, similar to that found on Brushy Mountain, which is created in exposed, high elevation, areas where the soil is thin and heath family plants dominate. About a mile past the heath bald, the trail enters the fraser and spruce fir zone prevalent in the higher peaks of the Smokies. Fantastic views of the towns of Sevier County are available here when weather permits, sometimes even extending to the outskirts of Knoxville, as the hiker closes in on the LeConte Lodge. The LeConte Lodge provides the only commercial lodging in the national park, as it operates about 10 rustic cabins with no electricity or appliances. The Lodge also operates an office which provides t-shirts and other merchandise for hikers and various amenities for guests of the lodge. For many, this signals the end of their journey, but the actual peaks of Le Conte all have separate trails a short distance from the lodge, with Cliff Tops and Myrtle Point each offering expansive panoramas of the mountains and valleys below.

== Maps and Directions ==
"Great Smoky Mountains National Park: Plan Your Visit: Grotto Falls". Archived from the original on May 5, 2012.

"Great Smoky Mountains National Park: Maps".

=== Topographic Maps ===
The Trillium Gap Trail is shown on the following 1:24,000-scale topographic maps published by the National Park Service:

"Mt Le Conte Quadrangle, Great Smoky Mountains 7.5 minute 1:24,000-scale series Topographic Maps" (PDF).
