= Alex Cole Cabin =

Historic house in Tennessee, United States

- U.S. National Register of Historic Places
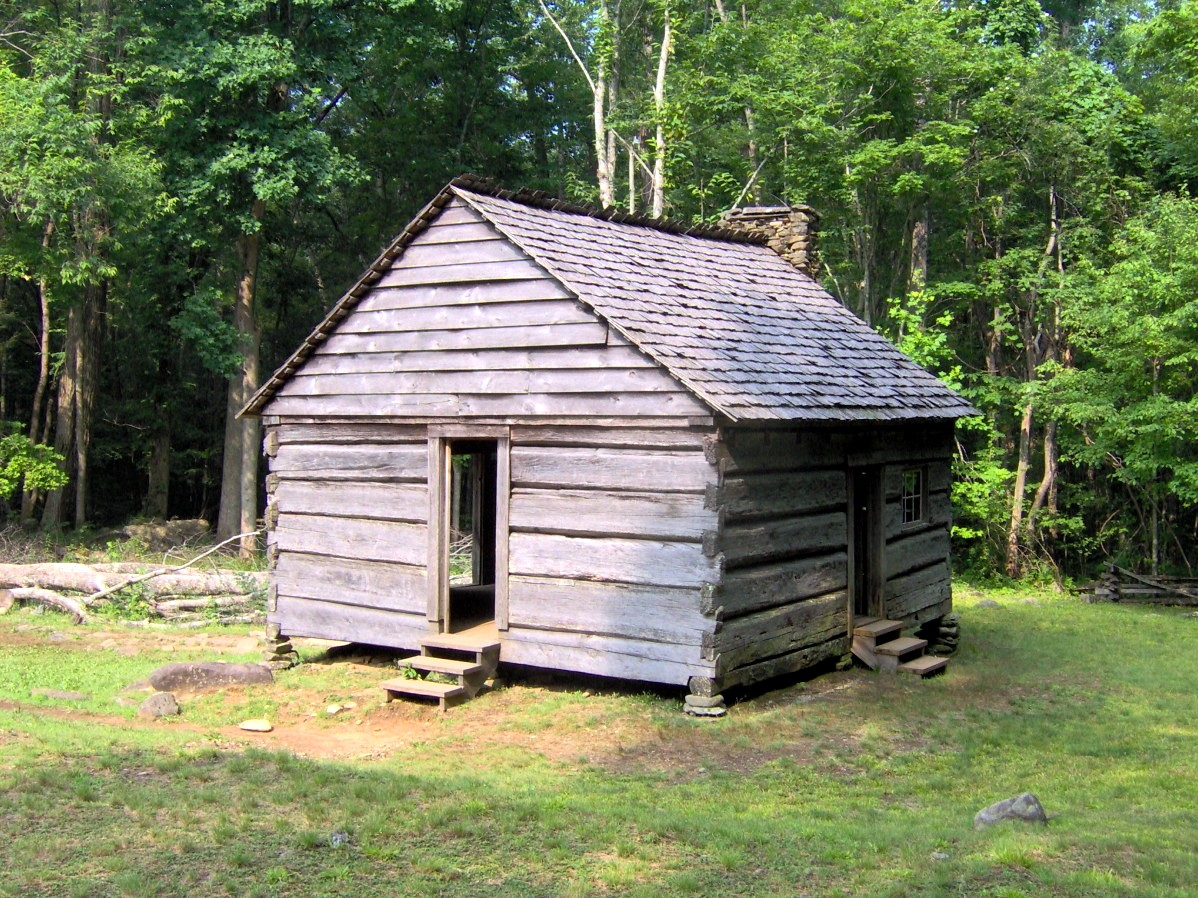
- Exterior of the cabin

- Location within Tennessee Location within the United States
- Nearest city: Gatlinburg, Tennessee
- Coordinates: 35°39′59″N 83°31′22″W
- Area: less than one acre
- NRHP reference No.: 76000165
- Added to NRHP: January 2, 1976

The Alex Cole Cabin is a historic house in Sevier County, Tennessee, United States, along Roaring Fork within the Great Smoky Mountains National Park. The last remaining building of the community of Sugarlands, it was built by Albert Alexander "Alex" Cole (1870–1958). The cabin was originally located at 35°40′0″N 83°31′17″W, across the Little Pigeon River from what is now the "Quiet Walkway" opposite the Huskey Gap Trailhead, just off Newfound Gap Road. After being placed on the National Register of Historic Places in the 1970s, the cabin was moved to the Jim Bales Place along the Roaring Fork Motor Nature Trail (the last owners of the Jim Bales Place lived in a relatively modern frame house).

Alex Cole was one of the most industrious residents of the Sugarlands. In the early 1900s, Cole and his sons made a weekly trek across Sugarland Mountain via what is now the Huskey Gap Trail to Elkmont, where they worked for the Little River Lumber Company. As tourism increased in the mountains in the 1920s, Cole began offering his services as a mountain guide, especially for tourists wanting to hike to the summit of Mount Le Conte. Historian Vic Weals wrote that Cole's "considerable knowledge of his wilderness" made him "one of the more sought-after native guides."

The cabin is a single-pen one-story cabin measuring approximately 20 feet (6.1 m) by 18 feet (5.5 m). The walls are built of hewn logs with dovetail notching. Fieldstone and loose rock comprise the cabin's foundation, and the cabin's gabled roof is covered with hand-split shingles. The interior contains a sawn board floor and a loft, and is accessed by a sawn board door. The chimney is built of masonry rubble.
