= James Archibald Hardison =

- Born: November 18, 1867
- Died: July 18, 1930 (aged 62)
- Spouse: Adele Louise Schwarz
- Children: Herman Hardison; James Hardison Jr.
- Relatives: Osborne Hardison

James Archibald Hardison (November 18, 1867 – July 18, 1930) was the husband of Adele Louise Schwarz and a member of the North Carolina Park Commission; Mount Hardison is named after him. James graduated from the University of Maryland School of Pharmacy in 1890. Afterwards, he returned to Wadesboro, North Carolina where he opened a pharmacy. The Calvary Episcopal Church Parish House was dedicated in his memory in 1948 by Bishop Edwin Penick.
