= Mount Hardison =

Mountain in the eastern Great Smoky Mountains

Highest point
- Elevation: 6,145 ft (1,873 m)
- Coordinates: 35.4118°N 83.1458°W

Geography
- Location: Swain County, North Carolina, US
- Parent range: Great Smoky Mountains
- Topo map: USGS Mount Hardison

Mount Hardison is a mountain in the eastern Great Smoky Mountains, located in the southeastern United States. At 6,145 feet (1,873 m) above sea level, Hardison is the thirteenth-highest in the Great Smoky Mountains National Park.

Mount Hardison is named for James Archibald Hardison, an original member of the North Carolina State Park Commission.
