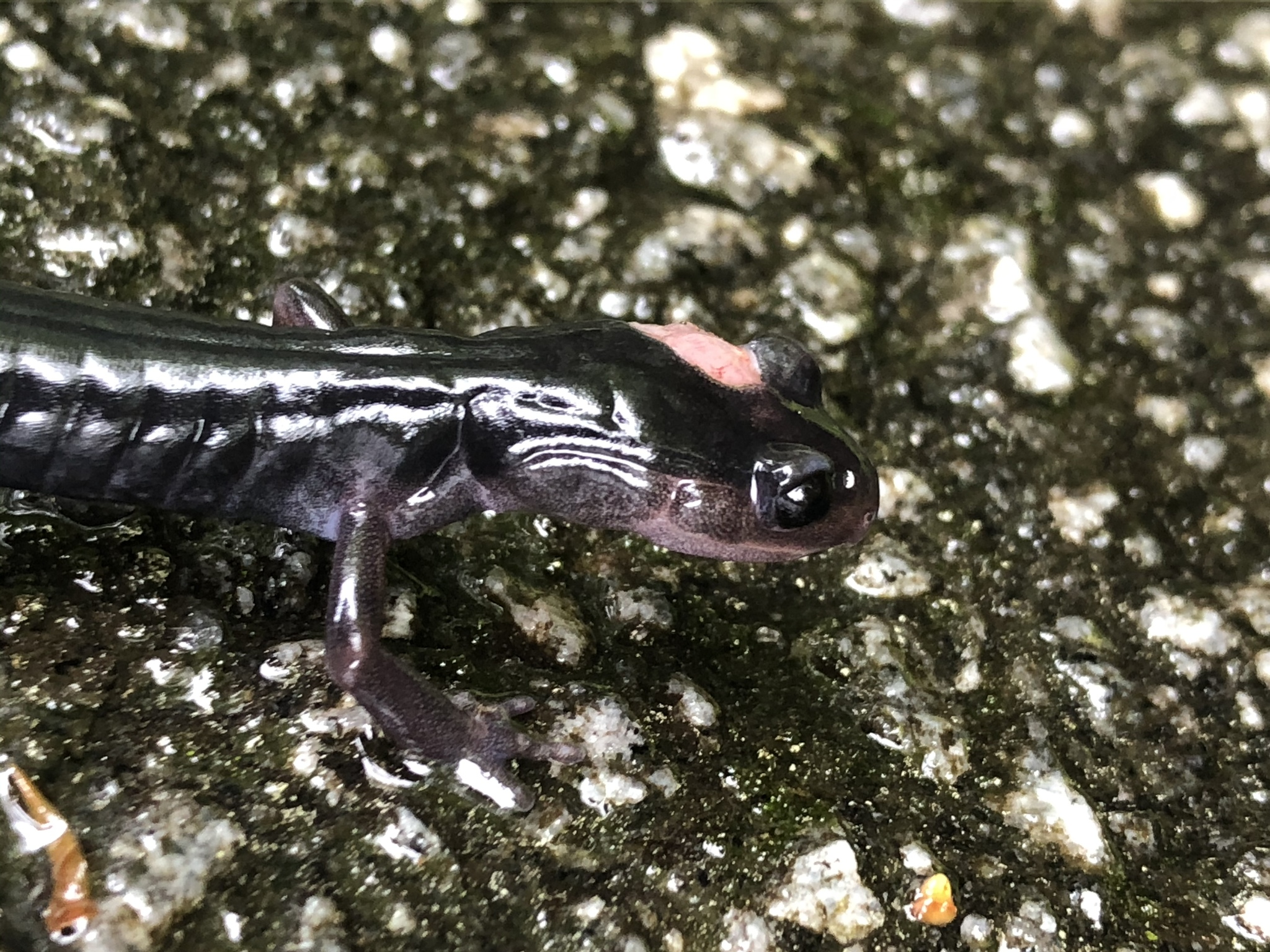

Conservation status
- Least Concern (IUCN 3.1)

Scientific classification
- Kingdom: Animalia
- Phylum: Chordata
- Class: Amphibia
- Order: Urodela
- Family: Plethodontidae
- Genus: Plethodon
- Species: P. metcalfi

Binomial name
- Plethodon metcalfi Brimley, 1912

= Southern gray-cheeked salamander =

Species of amphibian

The southern gray-cheeked salamander (Plethodon metcalfi) is a species of salamander in the family Plethodontidae endemic to the area where North Carolina, South Carolina, and Georgia adjoin each other in the southeastern United States. The species has a known altitudinal range of 256 to 1,295 m in the mountains of the region. Where their ranges overlap, it hybridizes with P. jordani and P. teyahalee. Its natural habitat is temperate forests.
