= Roaring Fork (Great Smoky Mountains) =

Stream in Tennessee

- Roaring Fork Historic District
- U.S. National Register of Historic Places
- U.S. Historic district
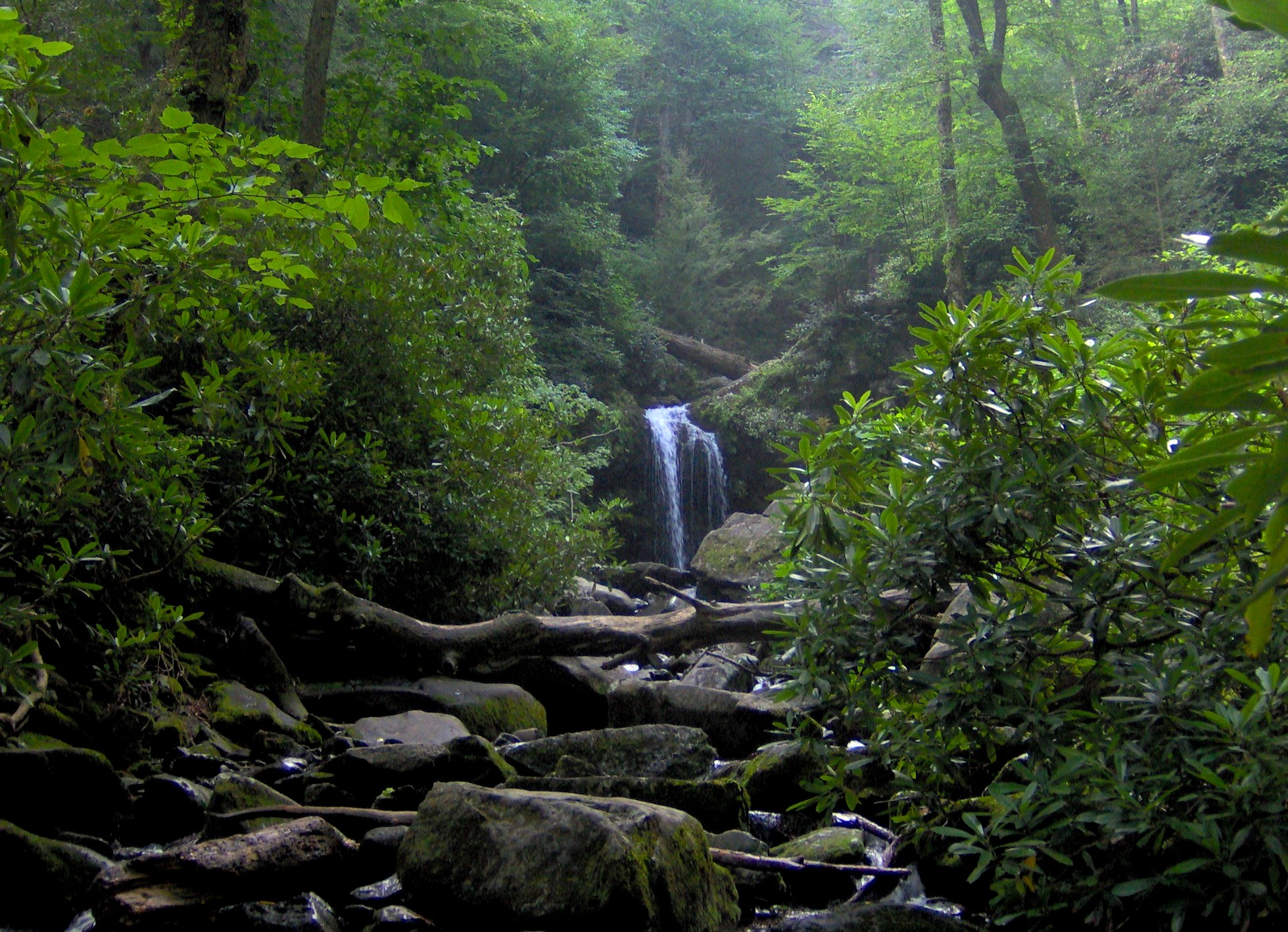
- Roaring Fork, with Grotto Falls in the distance

- Location within Tennessee Location within the United States
- Location: GSMNP
- Nearest city: Gatlinburg, Tennessee
- Coordinates: 35°41′54″N 83°28′4″W
- Built: 1880
- NRHP reference No.: 76000170
- Added to NRHP: March 16, 1976

Roaring Fork is a stream in the Great Smoky Mountains of Tennessee, located in the southeastern United States. Once the site of a small Appalachian community, today the stream's area is home to the Roaring Fork Motor Nature Trail and the Roaring Fork Historic District.

Like many mountain streams, Roaring Fork is volatile. While the stream presents as a peaceful trickle on any given day, it quickly becomes a raging whitewater rapid after a mild rain shower. The "roar" of the water is amplified by its echo on surrounding mountain ridges.

== Geography ==
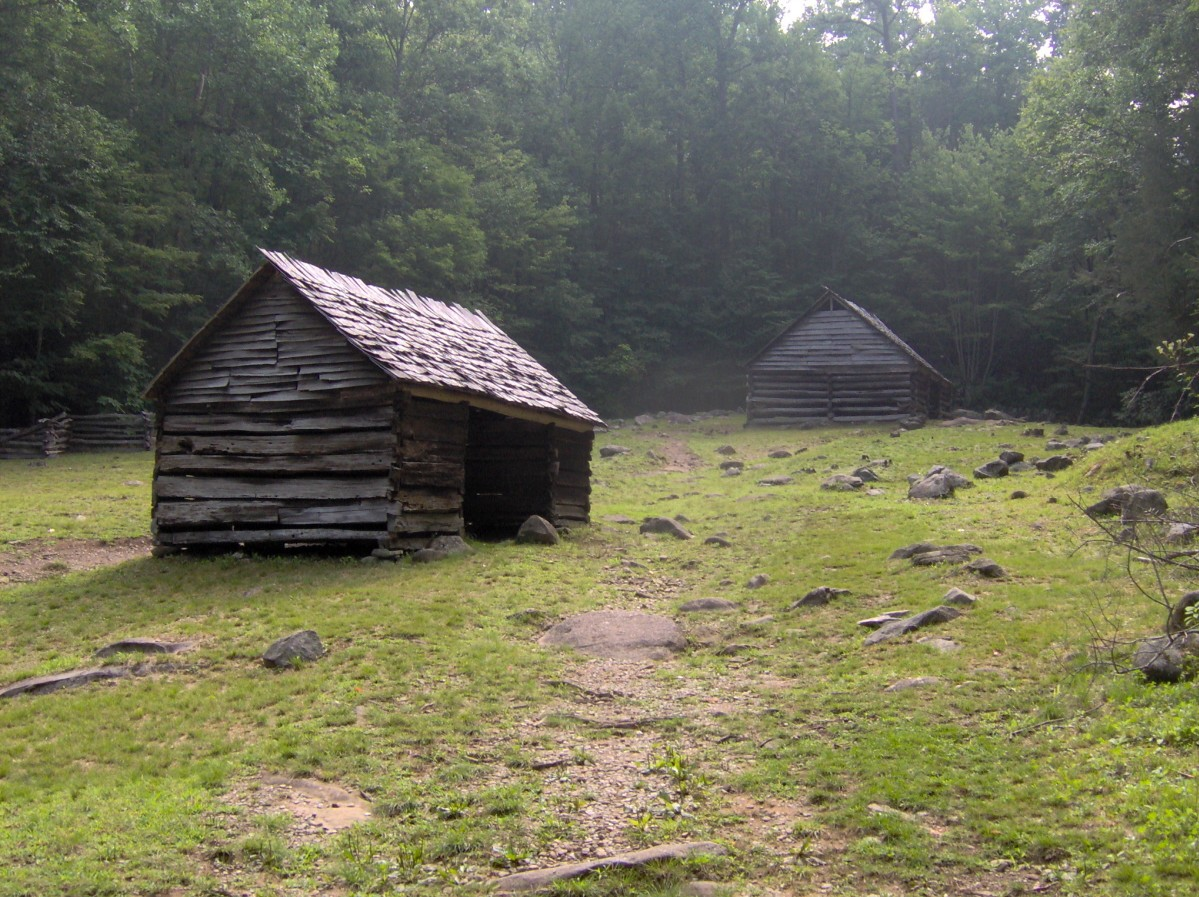
Sandstone rocks litter the ground at the Jim Bales Place

The source of Roaring Fork is located nearly 5,000 feet (1,500 m) up along the northern slopes of Mount Le Conte, where several small springs converge. The highest of these springs, known as Basin Spring, provides the water source for LeConte Lodge. From its source, Roaring Fork drops 2,500 feet (760 m) over just two miles (3.2 km), spilling over Grotto Falls and absorbing Surry Creek before steadying in a narrow valley between Mount Winnesoka and Piney Mountain. The mouth of Roaring Fork is located at the northern end of Gatlinburg, where it empties into the West Fork of the Little Pigeon River.

The Roaring Fork valley is underlain by Precambrian sandstone of the Ocoee Supergroup, a rock formation formed from ancient ocean sediments nearly a billion years ago. Roaring Fork Sandstone is found throughout the mid-level elevations of the northern Smokies and is especially common in Greenbrier to the east and the Sugarlands to the west. Over thousands of years, erosional forces have carried boulders composed of this sandstone down from boulder fields located higher up along the mountain ridges. This process has left the streambed of Roaring Fork and the flats in the Roaring Fork valley virtually covered with sandstone rocks of all sizes. Farmers who lived at Roaring Fork, the Sugarlands, and Greenbrier were continually moving and stacking these rocks, creating the characteristic rock walls that still criss-cross these areas today.

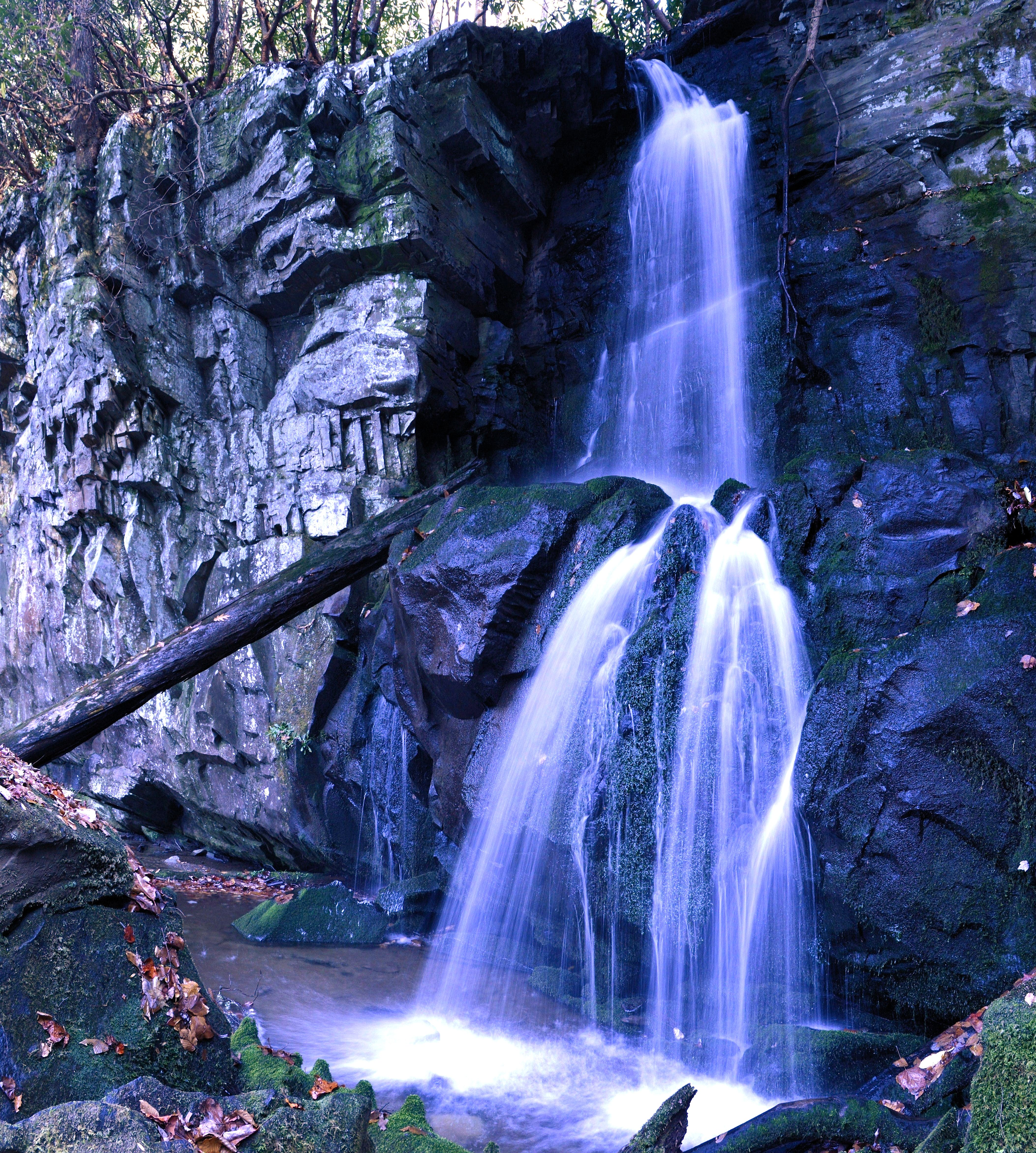
Baskins Creek Falls, located along Baskins Creek Trail in the heart of the Roaring Fork area

== Roaring Fork Historic District ==
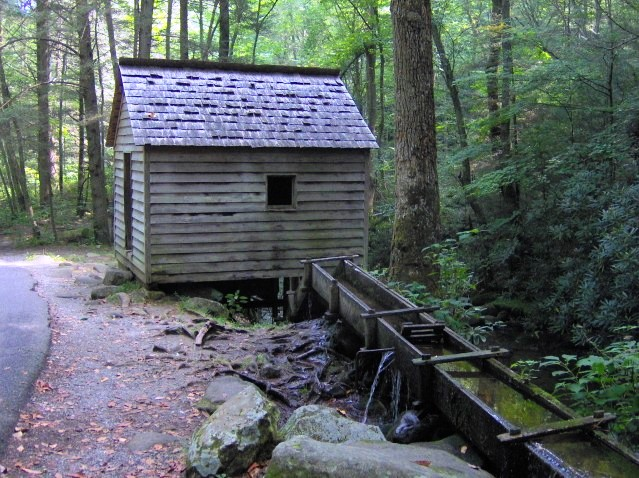
Alfred Reagan's tub mill

Between 1800 and 1810, the first permanent Euro-American settlers arrived in the White Oak Flats area around what is now Gatlinburg. In the following decades, their descendants spread out into the surrounding coves and valleys. Richard Reagan (1776–1829), the son of one of these pioneers, settled on a large plot of land just south of Gatlinburg along LeConte Creek. Some of Reagan's children settled to the west in the Sugarlands, while some of them moved east to the hollow along Roaring Fork, which was then known as "Spruce Flats." By 1900, three of Reagan's grandsons, Alfred Reagan (1856–1928), Aaron Reagan, and John H. Reagan were still farming along the stream, just above Gatlinburg.

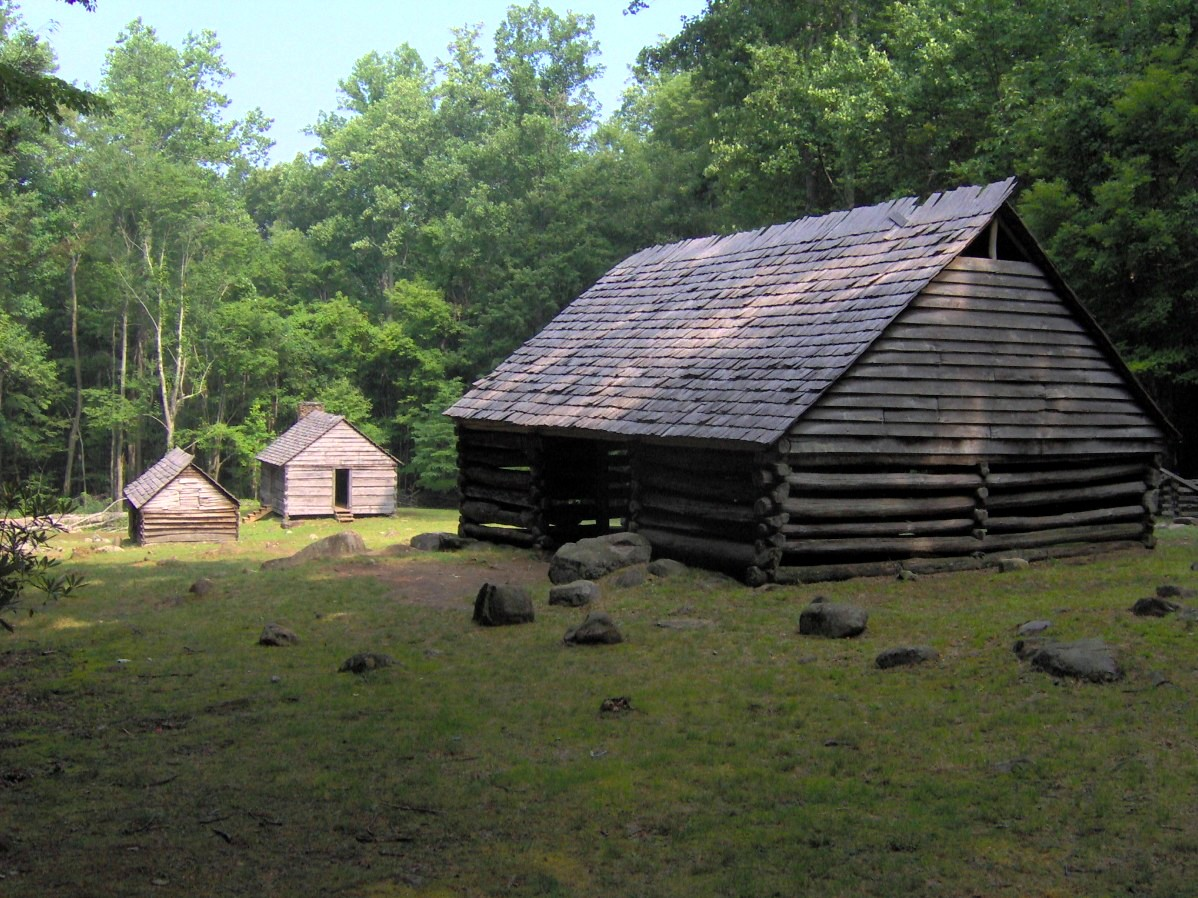
Jim Bales Place, with barn (right), corn crib (left), and the Alex Cole Cabin (center)

The Bales family settled in the upper section of Roaring Fork sometime in the 1830s or earlier. Caleb Bales (1839–1913), apparently a son or nephew of the first Bales to settle on Roaring Fork, owned a farm just south of the Reagan lands. Caleb's sons Jim Bales (1869–1939) and Ephraim Bales (1867–1936) would spend most of their lives on Roaring Fork farming land inherited from their father.

As the Bales and Reagan families lived on adjoining lands, the families intermarried. Caleb Bales married one of Richard Reagan's granddaughters, Elizabeth, in 1861. Ephraim Bales married a great-granddaughter of Richard Reagan, Minerva, in 1889. Caleb's daughter, Martha, married Alfred Reagan in 1879.

Uppermost on Roaring Fork, near where the stream absorbs Surry Creek, were farms owned by the Clabo family, Gilbert Ogle, and Jasper Mellinger. Former homesteads can usually be identified by the preponderance of young tuliptrees (rather than the more common hemlock or oak), as tuliptrees are the quickest to reclaim previously cultivated land.

Around 1850, the residents of Roaring Fork constructed a crude road connecting the area to White Oak Flats (this old road is now a stop along the Roaring Fork Motor Nature Trail). By 1900, the community had matured into a mountain hamlet with its own school, church, general store, and tub mills. In 1976, the Roaring Fork Historic District was listed on the National Register of Historic Places.

=== Jim Bales Place ===
The first historic stop along the Roaring Fork Motor Nature Trail is the Jim Bales Place, a farm which Jim Bales inherited from his father, Caleb. Jim, born James Wesley Bales in 1869, lived here for much of his life. He married Emma Ogle, a granddaughter of Gilbert Ogle, whose farm was located just above the Bales Place. As Bales got older, the farm passed on to other families, one of which erected a modern frame house on the land (known as the "fancy house") where they entertained visitors.

When the Park Service gained control of the land in the 1930s, the frame house was torn down. The Alex Cole Cabin, being more representative of the pioneer days of Appalachia, was moved to the farm from the Sugarlands. Bales' corn crib and barn remain, however.

=== Ephraim Bales Place ===
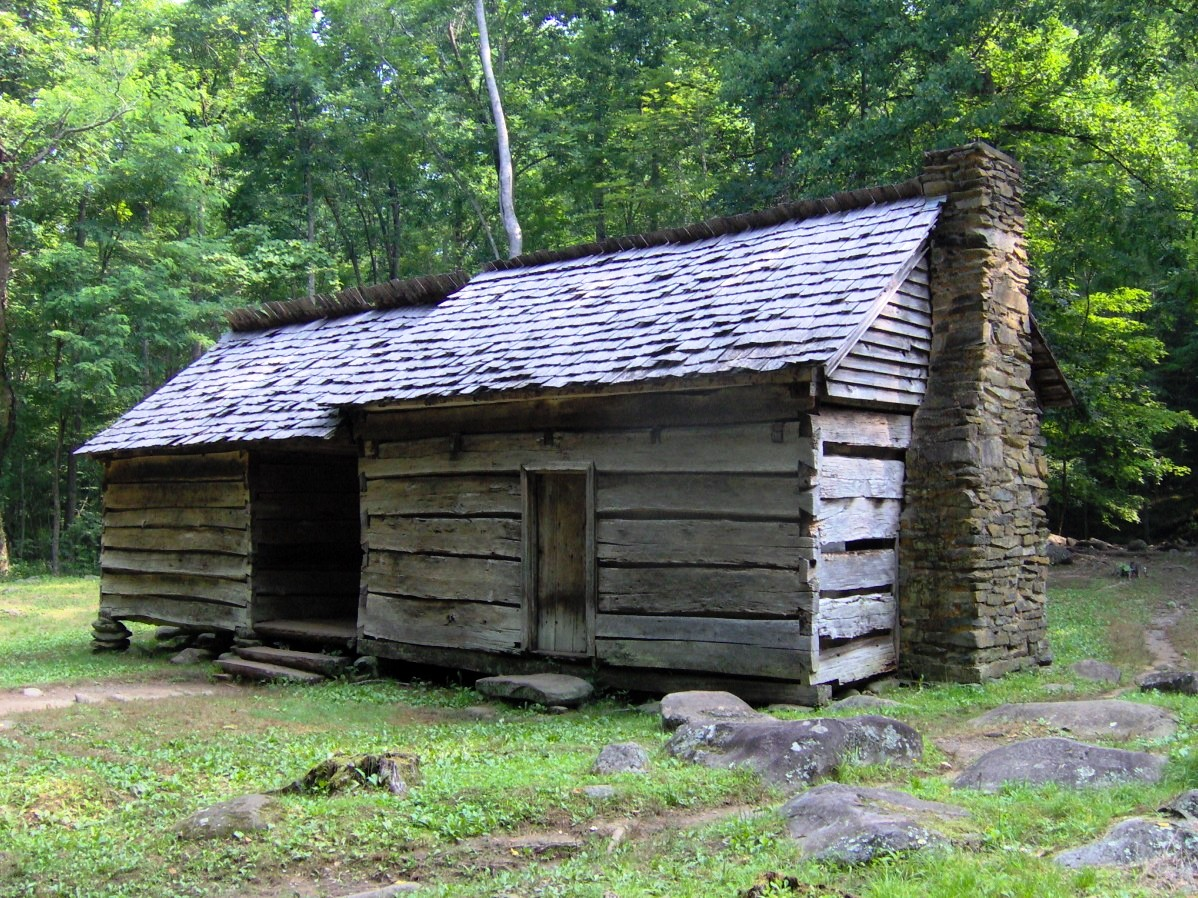
The Ephraim Bales Cabin

Just below the Jim Bales place is the farm of Ephraim and Minerva Bales. Ephraim, Jim Bales' older brother, farmed some 30 acres (120,000 m^{2}) of his 70-acre (280,000 m^{2}) plot. The other 40 acres (160,000 m^{2}) were mostly wooded, which the Bales family used for construction material and firewood.

The Bales cabin was a double cabin with a passageway known as a "dog trot" in between. Dog-trot cabins, which are fairly common throughout the southeastern U.S., typically involve two adjacent cabins with roughly 10 feet (3.0 m) in between, but with one continuous roof. The space between the two halves was relatively cool in summer and warm in winter, making it attractive to dogs. Both halves of the cabin have their own chimney.

With the exception of a back porch, the cabin remains largely as it was when the Bales family lived in here in the early 20th century. Along with the cabin, Bales' corn crib, hog pen, and barn are still standing today, just a few yards from the cabin. A rock wall and paling fence behind the cabin are representative of the two major barriers used in the northern Smokies in the late 19th and early 20th centuries.

=== Alfred Reagan Place ===
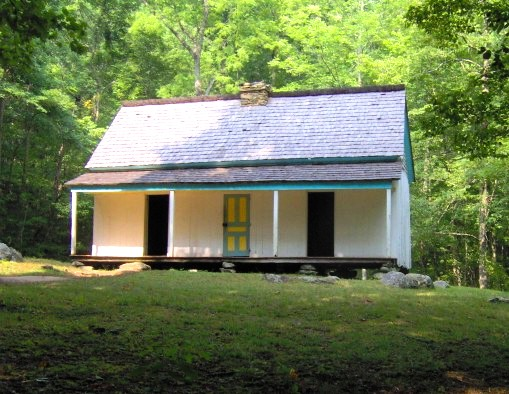
The Alfred Reagan Cabin

Alfred Reagan, a descendant of the area's first settlers, owned a small farm just below the Ephraim Bales Place. Reagan was a jack-of-all-trades, operating the Roaring Fork community's blacksmith shop, general store, and its most consistent grist mill. Reagan was also a part-time preacher at the Roaring Fork Church, for which he donated the land and helped build.

Of all the buildings on Reagan's farm, only his cabin and mill remain today. With its sawboard paneling and coat of paint, Reagan's cabin stands out among historical structures in the Smokies today. The cabin's design is known as a "saddlebag" design, which involves two cabins constructed around a single chimney. A kitchen area was added later.

The Reagan mill is a standard tub mill, with a flume directing water from Roaring Fork to power a tub-wheel turbine. The turbine turns a grindstone which breaks down corn and wheat into cornmeal and flour. Reagan's mill was well designed and well positioned. It is said that when other mills lacked sufficient water power because of low water levels, Reagan's mill would continue to operate.

=== Alex Cole Cabin ===
The Alex Cole Cabin is the last surviving structure from the Sugarlands community proper. Built by mountain guide Albert Alexander Cole, it has been moved from its original site to the Jim Bales Place along the Roaring Fork Motor Nature Trail.

== Motor Nature Trail ==
The Roaring Fork Motor Nature Trail is a narrow one-way road that is open to vehicular traffic (cars and small pickup trucks only) in spring, summer, and fall. Along with the historic district, the road passes by two overlooks and a forest that is representative of mid-level elevations in the Smokies.

The trail begins just past the Rainbow Falls Trailhead on Cherokee Orchard Road and slowly ascends Piney Mountain, topping out at an overlook on the mountain's northern slopes (the overlook's elevation is roughly 3,000 feet/910 meters). Just past the overlook, the road passes numerous large chestnut tree blowdowns. These trees, which often grew to 5–6 feet in diameter, were killed off by a blight in the 1930s.

As the road descends Piney Mountain, it passes a parking lot at the Trillium Gap Trailhead. This hiking trail leads past Grotto Falls and Trillium Gap en route to the summit of Mount Le Conte. Trillium Gap—the gap between Brushy Mountain and the main Le Conte massif—was named by Horace Albright, who observed the trillium-filled area in the 1920s.

Past the Trillium Gap Trailhead, the road enters the upper reaches of the Roaring Fork hollow. Patches of young tuliptrees mark the former location of the Clabo and Ogle farms. Immediately after the road crosses Roaring Fork, the Jim Bales Place is visible on the right (east). The Grapeyard Ridge Trail, which connects Roaring Fork to Greenbrier, begins just behind the barn. Past the Jim Bales Place are the Ephraim Bales Place and Alfred Reagan Place.

The road continues to descend past the historic district, passing along the way a parking lot that allows for a view of Roaring Fork. A thin waterfall known as "The Place of a Thousand Drips" is the last stop along the motor trail before it re-enters Gatlinburg.

== See also ==
- Noah Ogle Place
- List of rivers of Tennessee
