= Great Smoky Mountains National Park =

National park in Tennessee and North Carolina, US

- IUCN category II (national park)
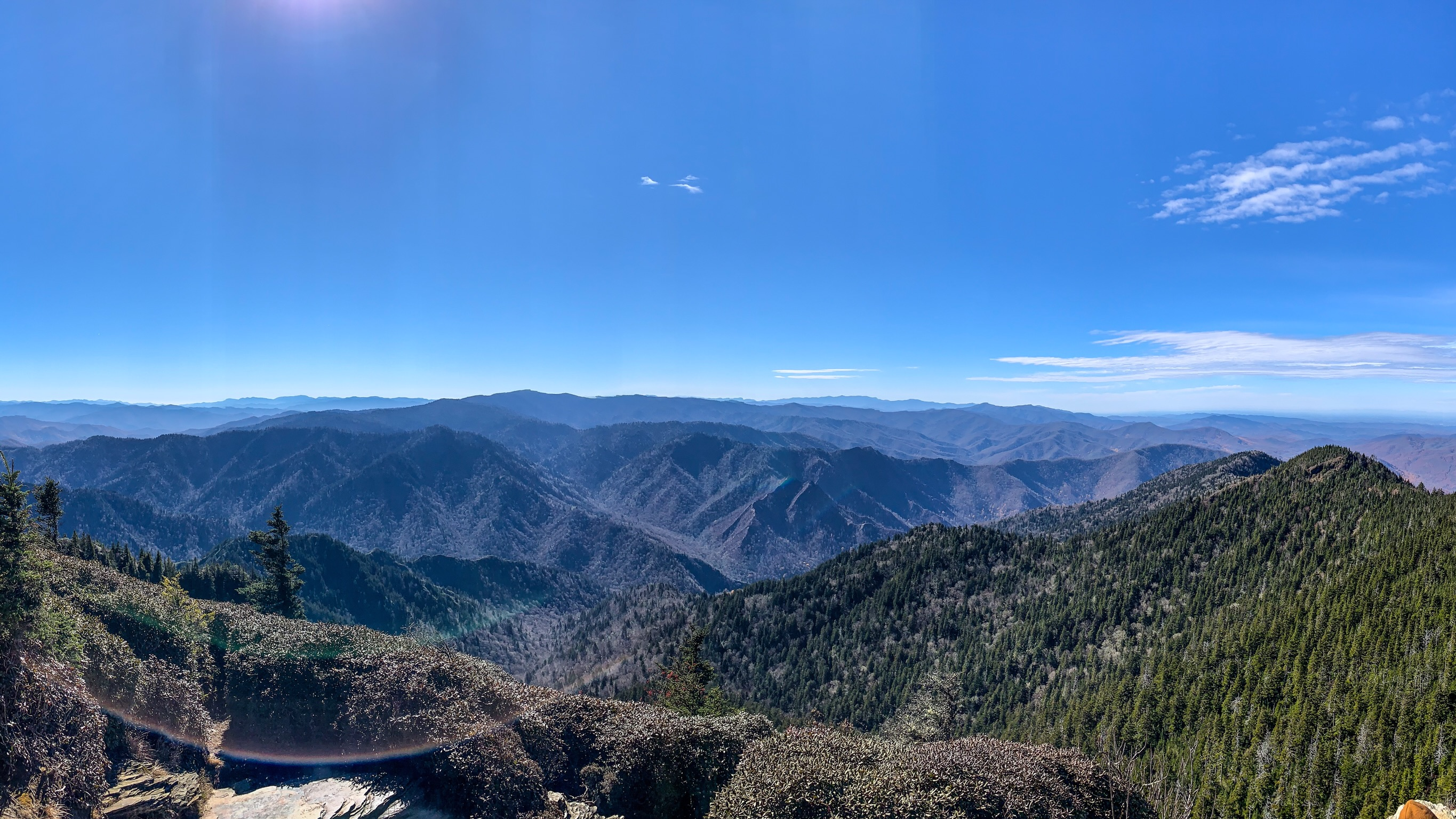
- View from the Cliff Tops formation atop Mount Le Conte

- Location within Tennessee Location within the United States
- Interactive map of Great Smoky Mountains National Park
- Location: Swain and Haywood counties, North Carolina; Sevier, Blount, and Cocke counties, Tennessee, United States
- Nearest city: Cherokee, North Carolina, Bryson City, North Carolina, Townsend, Tennessee, Cosby, Tennessee and Gatlinburg, Tennessee
- Coordinates: 35°36′40″N 83°25′30″W
- Area: 522,419 acres (2,114.15 km^{2})
- Established: June 15, 1934
- Visitors: 11,527,939 (in 2025)
- Governing body: National Park Service
- Website: nps.gov/grsm

UNESCO World Heritage Site
- Criteria: Natural: vii, viii, ix, x
- Reference: 259
- Inscription: 1983 (7th Session)

Great Smoky Mountains National Park is a national park of the United States in the southeast, with parts in North Carolina and Tennessee. The park straddles the ridgeline of the Great Smoky Mountains, part of the Blue Ridge Mountains and part of the Appalachian temperate rainforest, which are a division of the larger Appalachian Mountain chain. The park contains some of the highest mountains in eastern North America, including Kuwohi, Mount Guyot, and Mount Le Conte. The border between the two states runs northeast to southwest through the center of the park. The Appalachian Trail passes through the center of the park on its route from Georgia to Maine. With over 11 million visitors in 2025, the Great Smoky Mountains National Park is the most visited national park in the United States.

The park encompasses 522,419 acres (816.28 sq mi; 211,415.47 ha; 2,114.15 km^{2}), making it one of the largest protected areas in the eastern United States. The main park entrances are located along U.S. Highway 441 (Newfound Gap Road) in Gatlinburg, Tennessee, and Cherokee, North Carolina, and also in Townsend, Tennessee. The park is internationally recognized for its mountains, waterfalls, biodiversity, and forests. In addition, the park preserves multiple historical structures that were part of communities occupied by early European-American settlers of the area.

The park was chartered by the United States Congress in 1934 and officially dedicated by President Franklin D. Roosevelt in 1940. The Great Smoky Mountains was the first national park having land and other costs paid in part with federal funds; previous parks were funded wholly with state money or private funds. The park was designated as a UNESCO World Heritage Site in 1983 and an International Biosphere Reserve in 1988.

The park anchors a large tourism industry based in Sevier County, Tennessee, adjacent to the park. Major attractions include Dollywood, the second-most visited tourist attraction in Tennessee, Ober Gatlinburg, and Ripley's Aquarium of the Smokies. Tourism to the park contributes an estimated $2.5 billion annually into the local economy.

== Geography ==
The Great Smoky Mountains National Park covers a total of 522,419 acres (816.280 sq mi; 2,114.15 km^{2}) The park is roughly evenly divided between Tennessee and North Carolina, and is located within portions of Blount, Sevier, and Cocke Counties in Tennessee, and Swain and Haywood Counties in North Carolina. The park borders an Indian reservation to the south that is home to the Eastern Band of Cherokee Indians, a federally-recognized tribe who are descended from a small group of Cherokee who evaded the forced migration of the Cherokee people to present-day Oklahoma. The town of Gatlinburg is located directly north of the park. Other cities and towns adjacent to the park include Townsend in Tennessee and Bryson City, Fontana Dam, and Maggie Valley in North Carolina. The Cherokee National Forest borders the park to the east and west in Tennessee, and the Nantahala National Forest borders much of the park in North Carolina.

=== Mountains ===
The Great Smoky Mountains National Park protects the majority of the Great Smoky Mountains, a subrange of the Blue Ridge Mountains, which are a subrange of the Appalachian Mountains. The range runs roughly east to west, nestled between the Bald Mountains to the east, the Plott Balsams to the south, and the Unicoi Mountains to the west. The park also protects a small portion of foothills, which separate the range from the Ridge-and-Valley Appalachians to the north. From west to east, the range gradually widens, with most of the highest mountains located in the eastern half. Elevations in the park range from about 875 feet (267 m) to 6,643 feet (2,025 m) at the summit of Kuwohi.

Kuwohi is the highest mountain in Tennessee and the third-highest mountain east of the Mississippi River. The park contains 16 of the "Southern Sixers"; mountains in Tennessee and North Carolina that reach elevations higher than 6,000 feet (1,800 m). The second highest mountain in the park is Mount Guyot, at an elevation of 6,621 feet (2,018 m). Mount Le Conte, at an elevation of 6,593 feet (2,010 m), rises 5,301 feet (1,616 m) from its base to its summit, making it the tallest mountain in the United States east of the Rocky Mountains.

Nestled between the mountains are a number of deep valleys, some of which are known as coves. The largest and most prominent is Cades Cove, a broad, flat plain situated between the main range and some of the foothills. Other major valleys include The Sugarlands, Greenbrier, Ocanaluftee, Cataloochee, Elkmont, Tremont, and Deep Creek. These valleys are among the most accessible areas of the park, and are often used as reference points for major areas within the park.

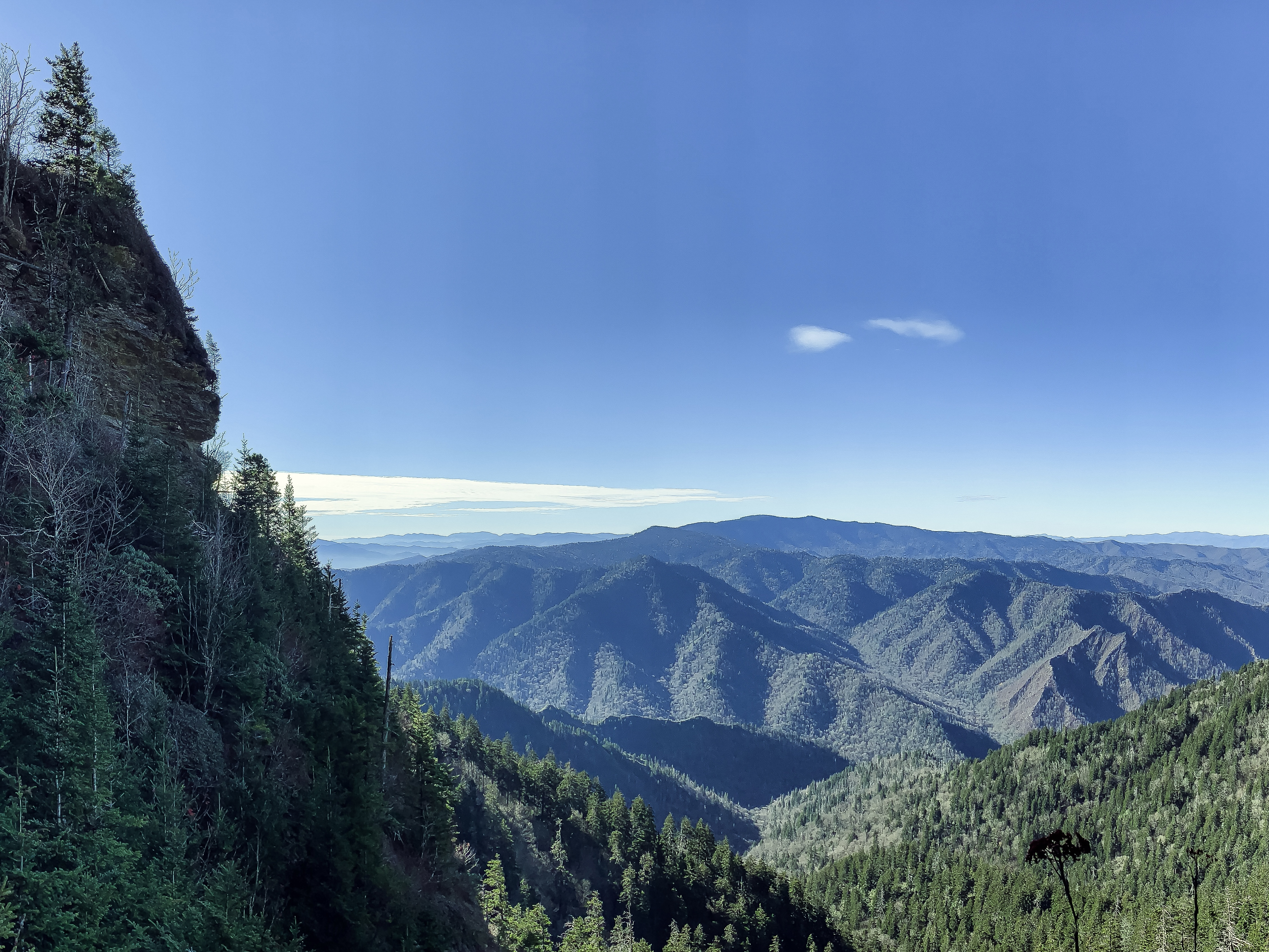
Kuwohi is the highest mountain in the national park at 6,643 feet (2,025 m)

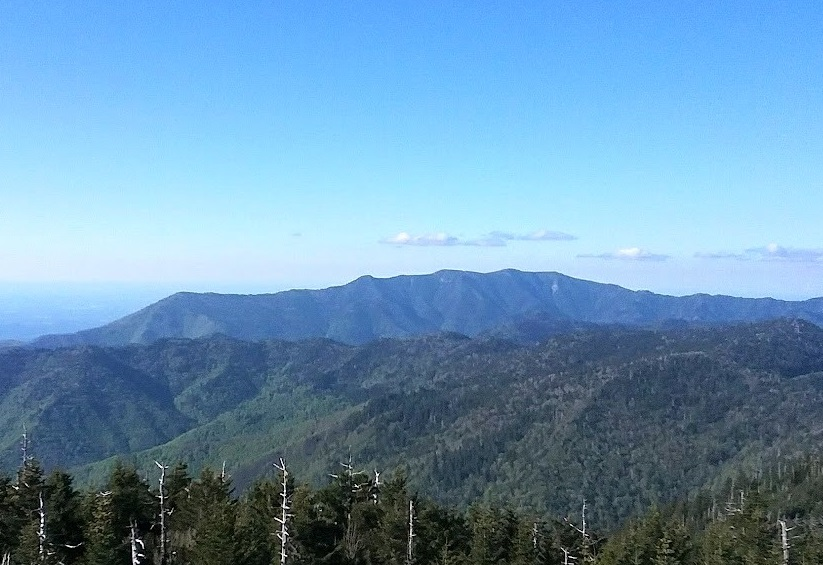
From its immediate base to its summit Mount Le Conte is the mountain with the highest relief east of the Rocky Mountains, rising 5,301 ft (1,616 m) from its base, near Gatlinburg, Tennessee (elevation 1,292 ft (394 m)) is the tallest mountain in eastern North America, measured from base to summit

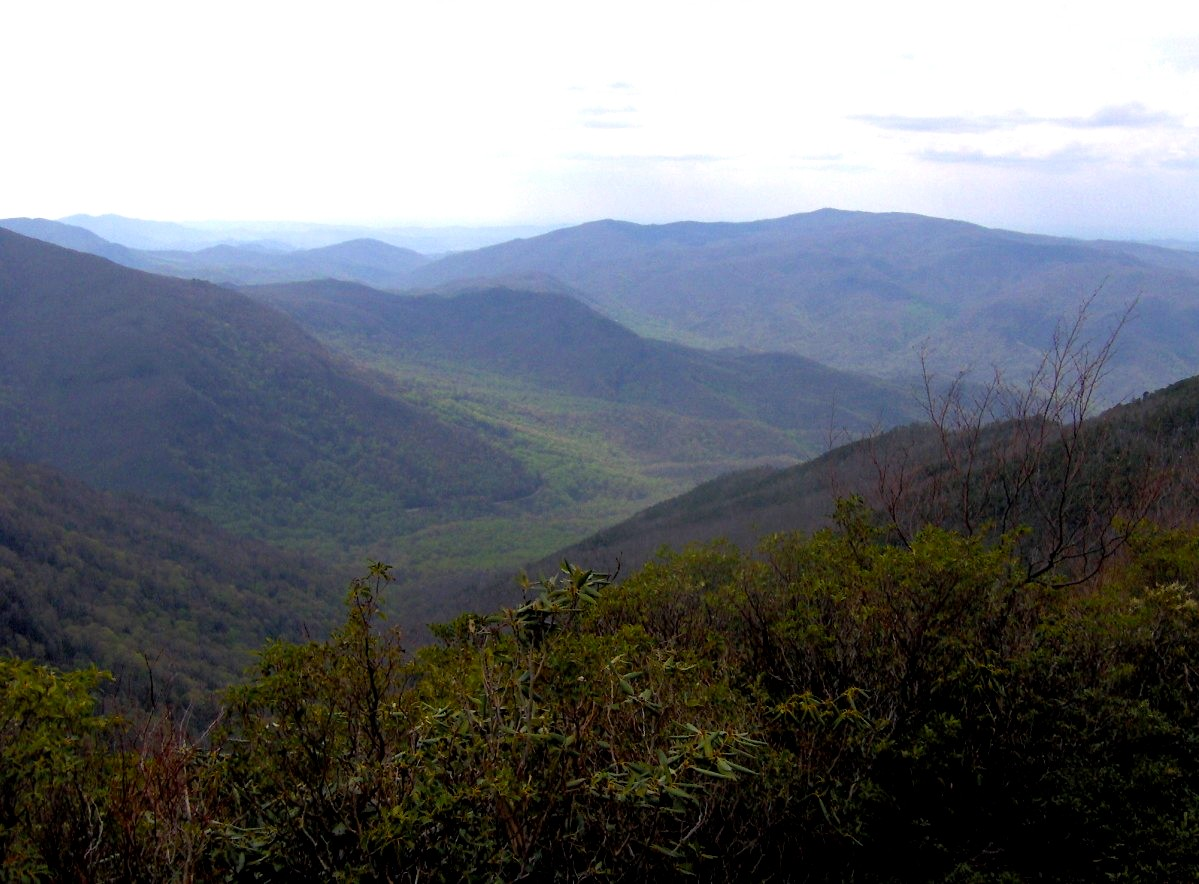
The Sugarlands are one of several prominent valleys within the range

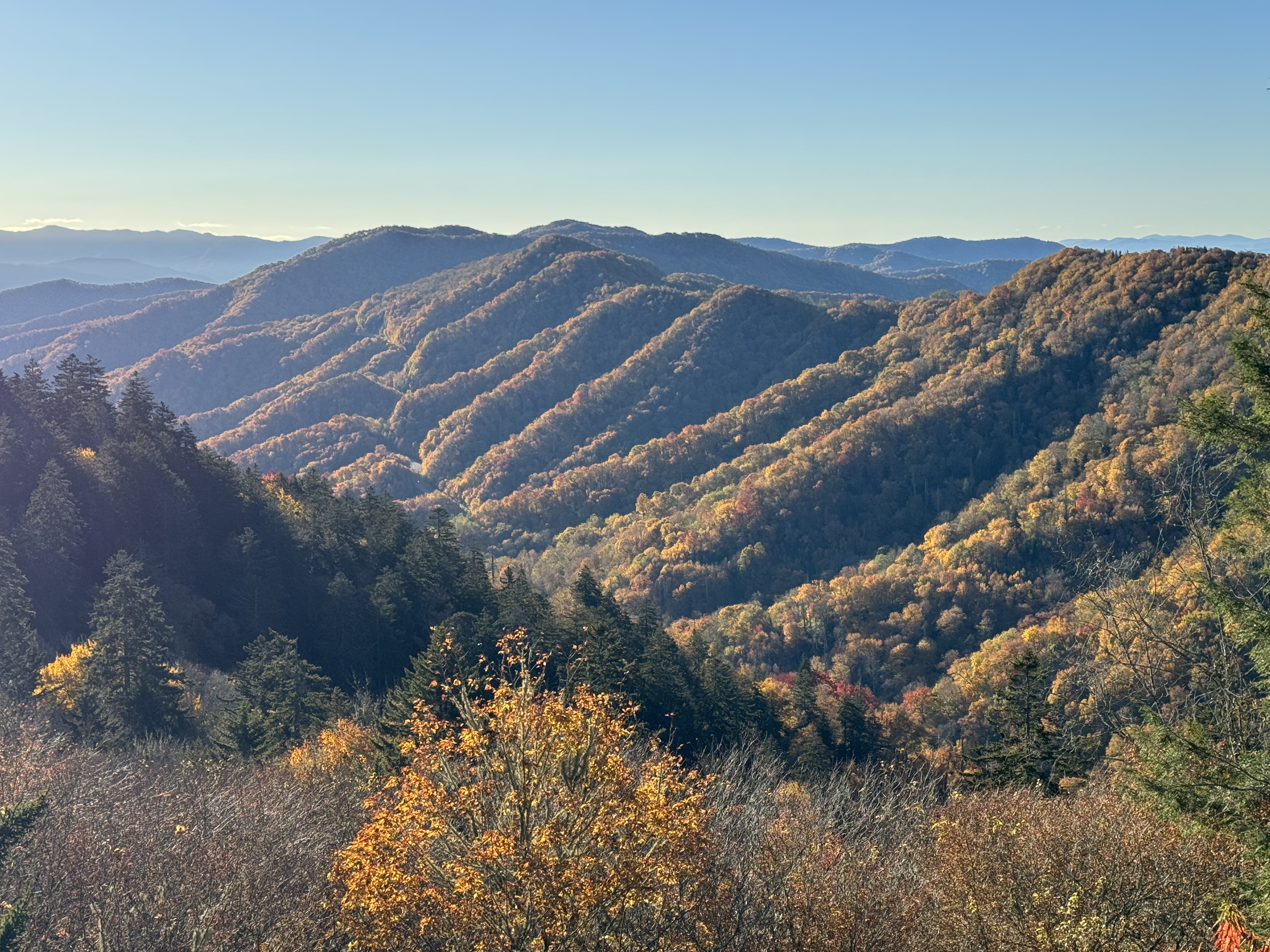
View of the mountains from Newfound Gap

=== Streams and waterfalls ===
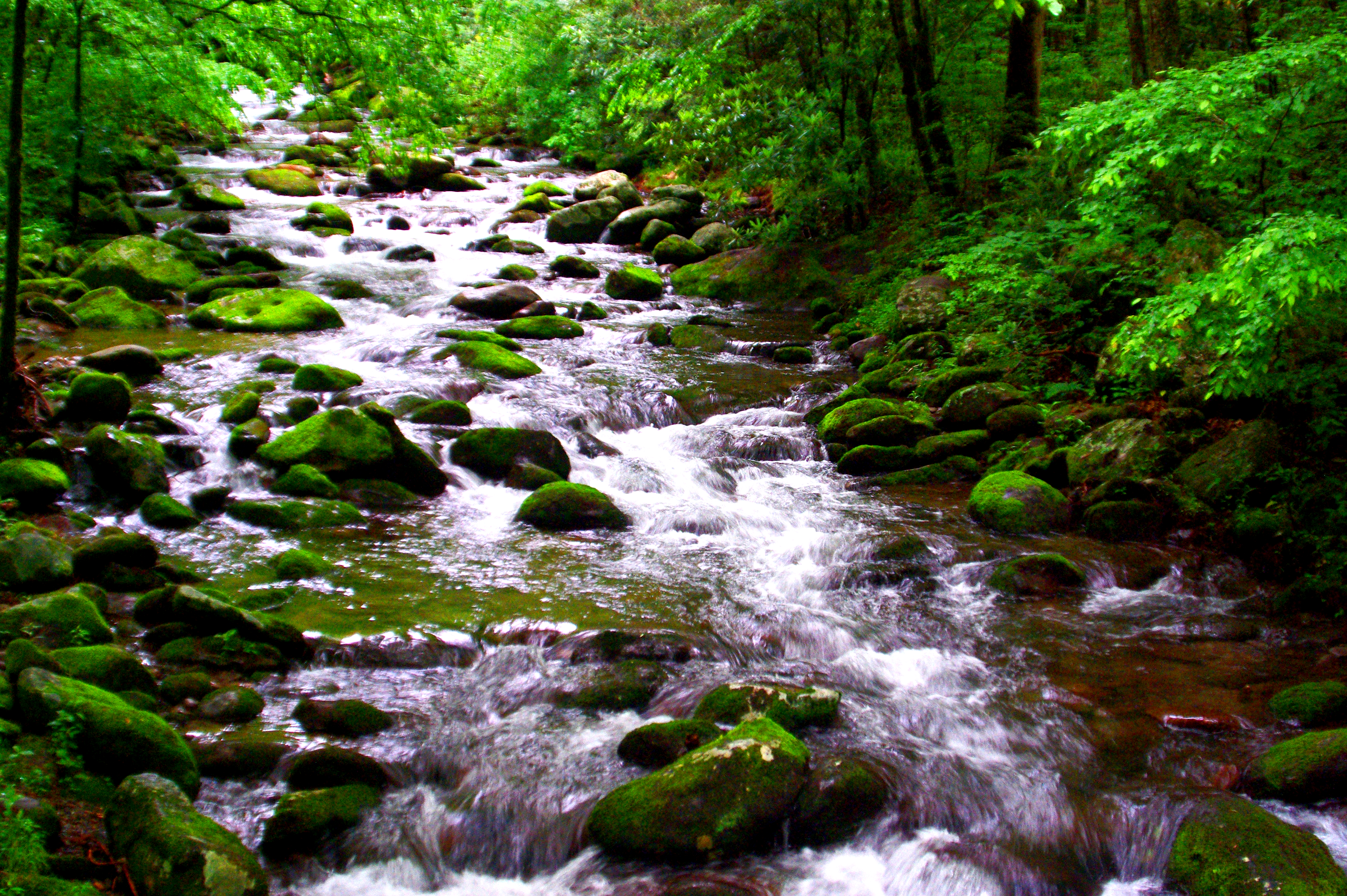
One of the many streams that run through Great Smoky Mountains National Park.

The Great Smoky Mountains National Park is located entirely within the Tennessee Valley, the watershed of the Tennessee River, and contains an estimated 2,900 miles (4,700 km) of streams. The Little Tennessee River runs along the southwestern border of the park, which is impounded by Chilhowee Dam, Calderwood Dam, Cheoah Dam, and Fontana Dam along the boundary. The Pigeon River flows through a deep gorge near the eastern boundary of the park, separating the range from the Bald Mountains to the east. The Plott Balsams border the range to the south. Several smaller rivers have their source in the park, including the three prongs of the Little Pigeon River, the Oconaluftee River, and the Little River. Other major streams include Hazel Creek and Eagle Creek in the southwest, Raven Fork near Oconaluftee, Cosby Creek near Cosby, and Roaring Fork near Gatlinburg. More than 100 prominent waterfalls are located within the park. The tallest is Ramsey Cascades, located at the base of Mt. Guyot. This waterfall drops 100 feet (30 m) over rock outcroppings into a small pool below. Rainbow Falls is the tallest single-drop waterfall, plunging 80 feet (24 m) along LeConte Creek. Other popular waterfalls include Grotto Falls, Laurel Falls, Abrams Falls, Mingo Falls, Mouse Creek Falls, and Hen Wallow Falls.

=== Historic areas ===
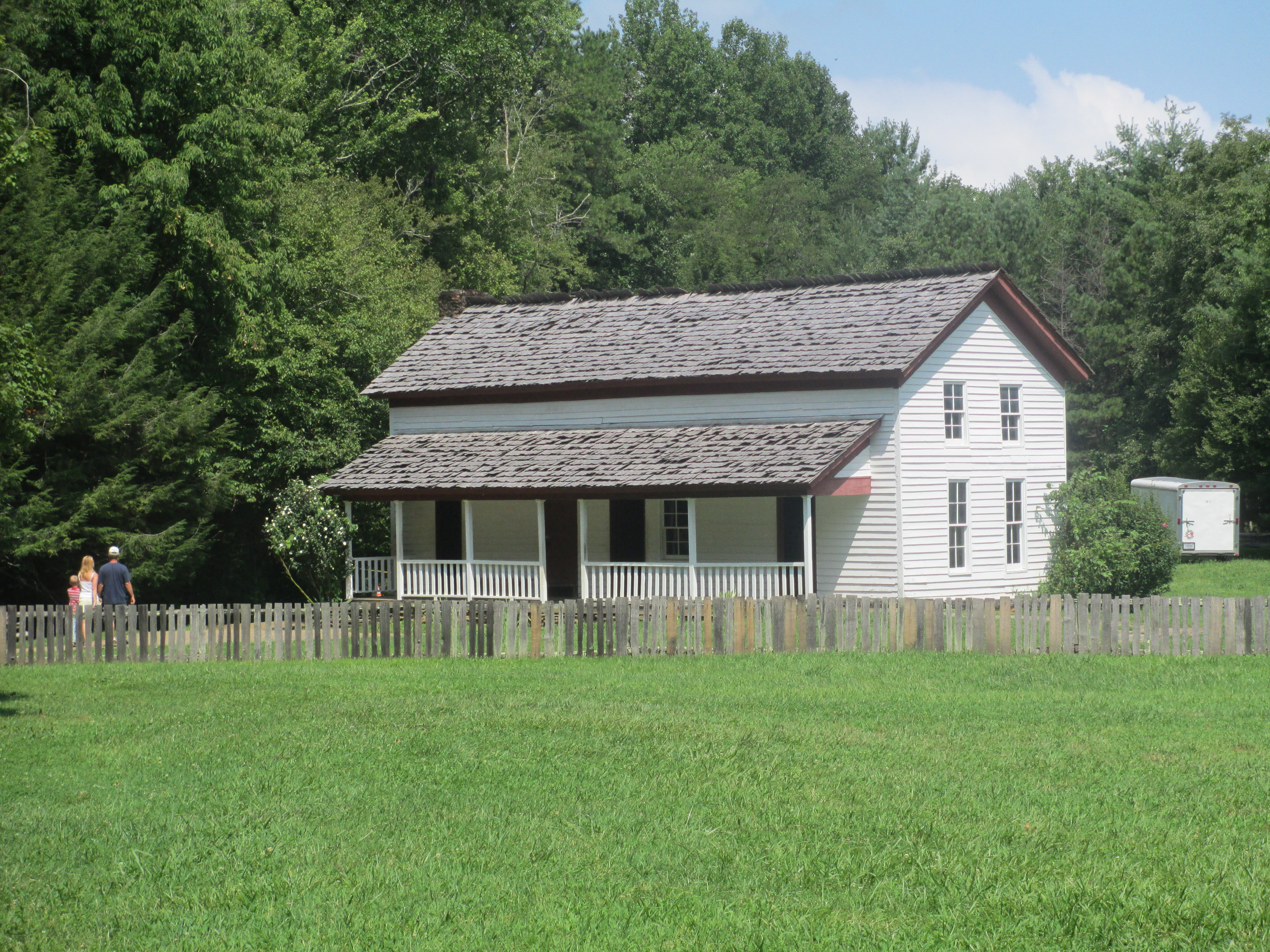
The Becky Cable House in the Cades Cove Historic District was built in 1879.

The park service maintains four historic districts and one archaeological district within park boundaries, as well as nine individual listings on the National Register of Historic Places. Notable structures not listed include the Mountain Farm Museum buildings at Oconaluftee and buildings in the Cataloochee area. The Mingus Mill (in Oconaluftee) and Smoky Mountain Hiking Club cabin in Greenbrier have been deemed eligible for listing.

Historic districts

- Cades Cove Historic District
- Elkmont Historic District
- Oconaluftee Archaeological District
- Noah Ogle Place
- Roaring Fork Historic District

Individual listings

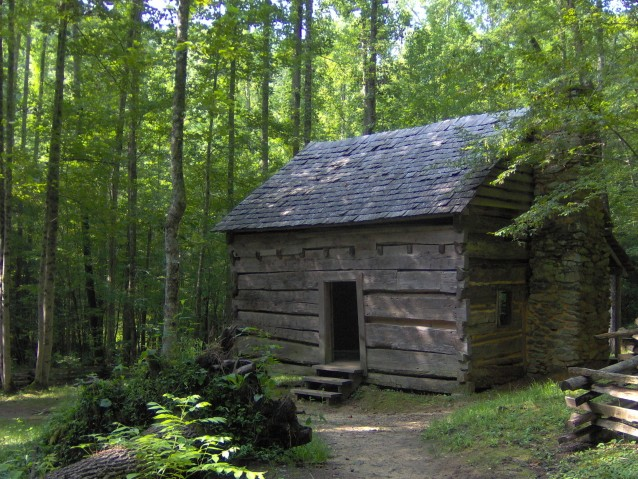
The John Ownby Cabin in The Sugarlands valley was built in 1860.

- Alex Cole Cabin
- Kuwohi Observation Tower
- Hall Cabin (in Hazel Creek area)
- John Messer Barn
- John Ownby Cabin
- Oconaluftee Baptist Church (also called Smokemont Baptist Church)
- Tyson McCarter Place
- Mayna Treanor Avent Studio
- Little Greenbrier School
- Walker Sisters Place

== Geology ==
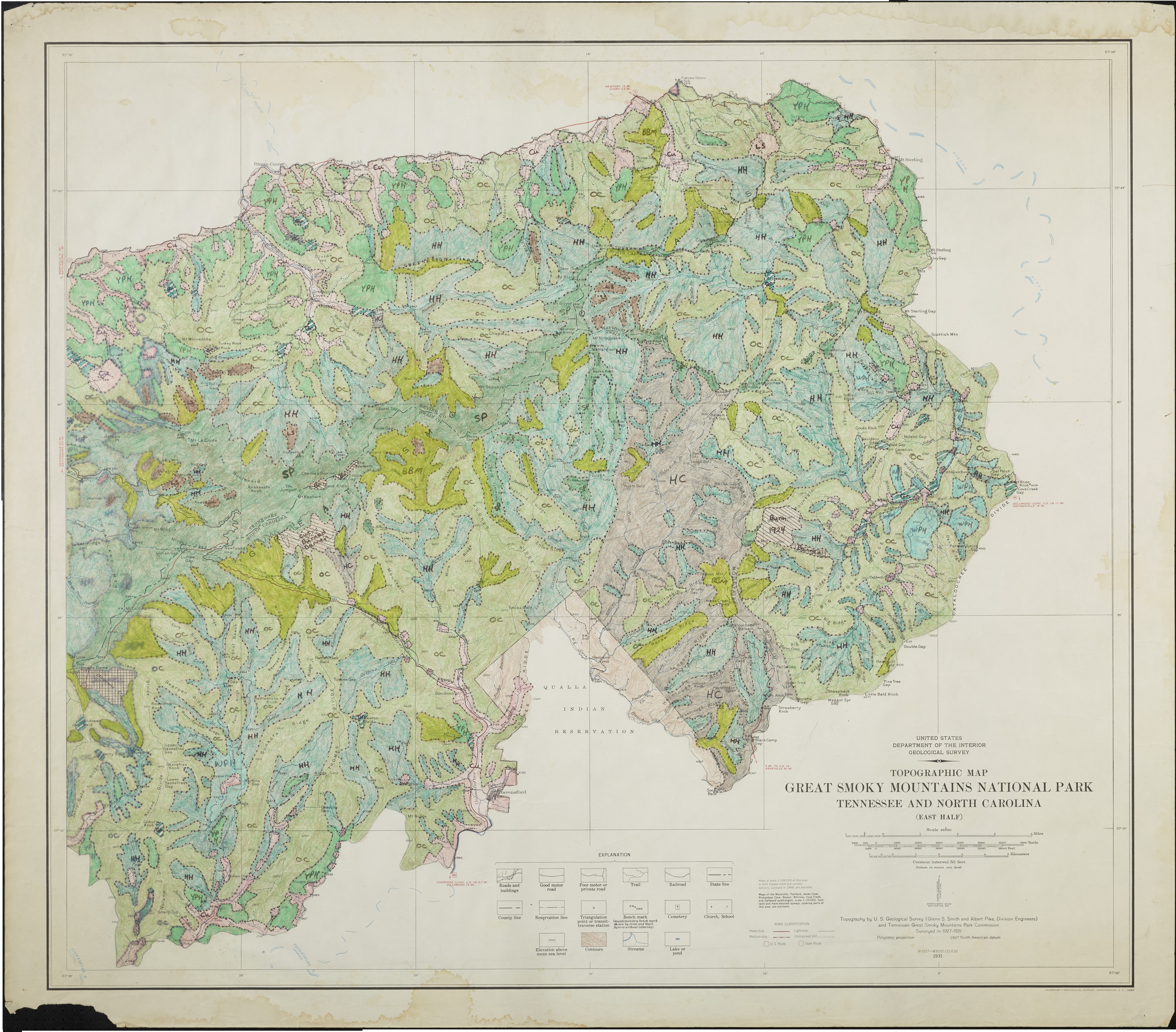
Great Smoky Mountains National Park, Tennessee and North Carolina Topographic Map.

The majority of rocks in the Great Smoky Mountains National Park are late Precambrian rocks that are part of the Ocoee Supergroup. This group consists of metamorphosed sandstones, phyllites, schists, and slate. Early Precambrian rocks are not only the oldest rocks in the park but also the dominant rock type in sites such as the Raven Fork valley and upper Tuckasegee River between Cherokee and Bryson City. They primarily consist of metamorphic gneiss, granite, and schist. Cambrian sedimentary rocks can be found among the bottom of the foothills to the northwest, and in limestone coves. One of the most visited attractions in the mountains is Cades Cove, which is a window or an area where older rocks made out of sandstone surround the valley floor of younger rocks made out of limestone.

The oldest rocks in the Smokies are the Precambrian gneiss and schists which were formed over a billion years ago from the accumulation of marine sediments and igneous rock. In the late Precambrian, the primordial ocean expanded, and the more recent Ocoee Supergroup rocks formed from the accumulation of eroding land mass onto the continental shelf. In the Paleozoic era, the ocean deposited a thick layer of marine sediments which left behind sedimentary rock. During the Ordovician period, the collision of the North American and African tectonic plates initiated the Alleghenian orogeny that created the Appalachian range. During the Mesozoic era rapid erosion of softer sedimentary rocks re-exposed the older Ocoee Supergroup formations.

Around 20,000 years ago, subarctic glaciers advanced southward across North America, and although they never reached the Smokies, the advancing glaciers led to colder mean annual temperatures and an increase in precipitation throughout the range. Trees were unable to survive at the higher elevations and were replaced by tundra vegetation. Spruce-fir forests occupied the valleys and slopes below approximately 4,950 feet (1,510 m). The persistent freezing and thawing during this period created the large blockfields that are often found at the base of large mountain slopes.

== Environment ==
=== Climate ===
According to the Köppen climate classification system, Great Smoky Mountains National Park has two climate types: humid subtropical (Cfa), and temperate oceanic (Cfb). The plant hardiness zone at Kuwohi Visitor Center is 5b with an average annual extreme minimum temperature of −14.3 °F (−25.7 °C). Ascending the mountains is comparable to a trip from Tennessee to Canada.

Climate data for Kuwohi Visitor Center, North Carolina (1981–2010 averages). Elevation 6,348 feet (1,935 m).
Month	Jan	Feb	Mar	Apr	May	Jun	Jul	Aug	Sep	Oct	Nov	Dec	Year
Mean daily maximum °F (°C)	40.5 (4.7)	43.9 (6.6)	51.5 (10.8)	61.5 (16.4)	67.5 (19.7)	73.3 (22.9)	75.6 (24.2)	75.4 (24.1)	71.4 (21.9)	63.8 (17.7)	52.5 (11.4)	43.7 (6.5)	60.1 (15.6)
Daily mean °F (°C)	31.2 (−0.4)	34.1 (1.2)	40.5 (4.7)	49.2 (9.6)	56.4 (13.6)	63.2 (17.3)	66.2 (19.0)	65.7 (18.7)	60.7 (15.9)	52.3 (11.3)	42.3 (5.7)	34.3 (1.3)	49.7 (9.8)
Mean daily minimum °F (°C)	21.9 (−5.6)	24.2 (−4.3)	29.6 (−1.3)	36.9 (2.7)	45.3 (7.4)	53.1 (11.7)	56.7 (13.7)	55.9 (13.3)	50.0 (10.0)	40.8 (4.9)	32.1 (0.1)	24.9 (−3.9)	39.4 (4.1)
Average precipitation inches (mm)	7.38 (187)	6.56 (167)	6.69 (170)	5.65 (144)	6.61 (168)	6.75 (171)	7.17 (182)	5.72 (145)	6.38 (162)	4.89 (124)	7.60 (193)	6.48 (165)	77.88 (1,978)
Average relative humidity (%)	71.9	72.8	68.1	64.4	76.2	82.8	83.6	85.4	82.7	74.7	72.8	76.2	76.0
Average dew point °F (°C)	23.2 (−4.9)	26.3 (−3.2)	30.8 (−0.7)	37.7 (3.2)	49.0 (9.4)	57.9 (14.4)	61.1 (16.2)	61.2 (16.2)	55.4 (13.0)	44.5 (6.9)	34.2 (1.2)	27.6 (−2.4)	42.5 (5.8)
Mean monthly sunshine hours	155.0	141.3	217.0	240.0	279.0	270.0	279.0	248.0	210.0	217.0	150.0	124.0	2,530.3
Mean daily sunshine hours	5	5	7	8	9	9	9	8	7	7	5	4	7
Mean daily daylight hours	10.1	10.9	12.0	13.1	14.1	14.5	14.3	13.5	12.4	11.3	10.3	9.8	12.2
Percentage possible sunshine	50	46	58	61	64	62	63	59	56	62	49	41	56
Average ultraviolet index	3	4	6	8	9	10	10	9	8	5	3	2	6
Source 1: PRISM Climate Group
Source 2: Weather Atlas (sun data)

The humid, subtropical air mass typically in place over the Smoky Mountains, coupled with orographic lift, produces large amounts of precipitation. Annual precipitation amounts range from 50–80 in (1,300–2,000 mm), with heavy winter snowfall in the higher elevations. Flash flooding often occurs after heavy rain.

The average temperature difference between the mountains, such as Newfound Gap at 5,048 ft (1,539 m) above MSL, and the valleys at about 1,600 ft (488 m), is between 10–13 °F (5.6–7.2 °C) for highs, and between 3–6 °F (1.7–3.3 °C) for lows. The difference between high temperatures is similar to the moist adiabatic lapse rate of 3.3 °F (1.8 °C) per 1,000 ft (300 m), while the smaller difference between low temperatures is the result of frequent temperature inversions developing in the morning, most often in autumn.

Strong damaging winds of 80–100 mph (130–160 km/h) or higher occur a few times each year around the Smoky Mountains, mainly during the cool season from October to April, as a result of a phenomenon known as mountain waves. Mountain waves are strongest in a narrow area along the foothills and can create extensive areas of fallen trees and roof damage, especially around Cades Cove and Cove Mountain. Strong winds created by mountain waves were a contributing factor in the devastating Gatlinburg fire on November 28, 2016, during the 2016 Great Smoky Mountains wildfires. Damaging winds can also be generated by strong thunderstorms, with tornadoes and strong thunderstorm complexes (also known as mesoscale convective systems) occasionally affecting the Smoky Mountains.

=== Air pollution ===
The park is affected by air pollution because of increased development nearby. In a 2004 report by the National Parks Conservation Association, Great Smoky Mountains National Park was considered the most polluted national park. From 1999 to 2003, the park recorded approximately 150 unhealthy air days, the equivalent of about one month of unhealthy air days per year. In 2013, Colorado State University reported that, with the passing of the United States Clean Air Act in 1970 and the subsequent implementation of the Acid Rain Program, there had been a "significant improvement" to the air quality in the Great Smoky Mountains from 1990 to 2010. With steady improvements in noxious emissions, visibility in the park on the haziest days has improved from an average of 9 miles in 1998 to 40 miles in 2018. A report published in 2023 by the North Carolina Division of Air Quality indicates significant drops in emissions of sulfur dioxide, carbon monoxide, oxides of nitrogen, volatile organic compounds, and fine particulate matter.

== Biology and ecology ==
The Great Smoky Mountains National Park is the most biologically diverse national park in the United States. About 19,000 species of organisms are known to live in the park, and scientists estimate that as many as 80,000 to 100,000 additional species may also be present. The land now protected by the park became a refuge for plants and animals that were displaced during the Last Glacial Period. The immense biodiversity is also supported by the rainy and temperate climate. No other location of similar size within a temperate climate is known to match the park's biodiversity.

=== Flora ===
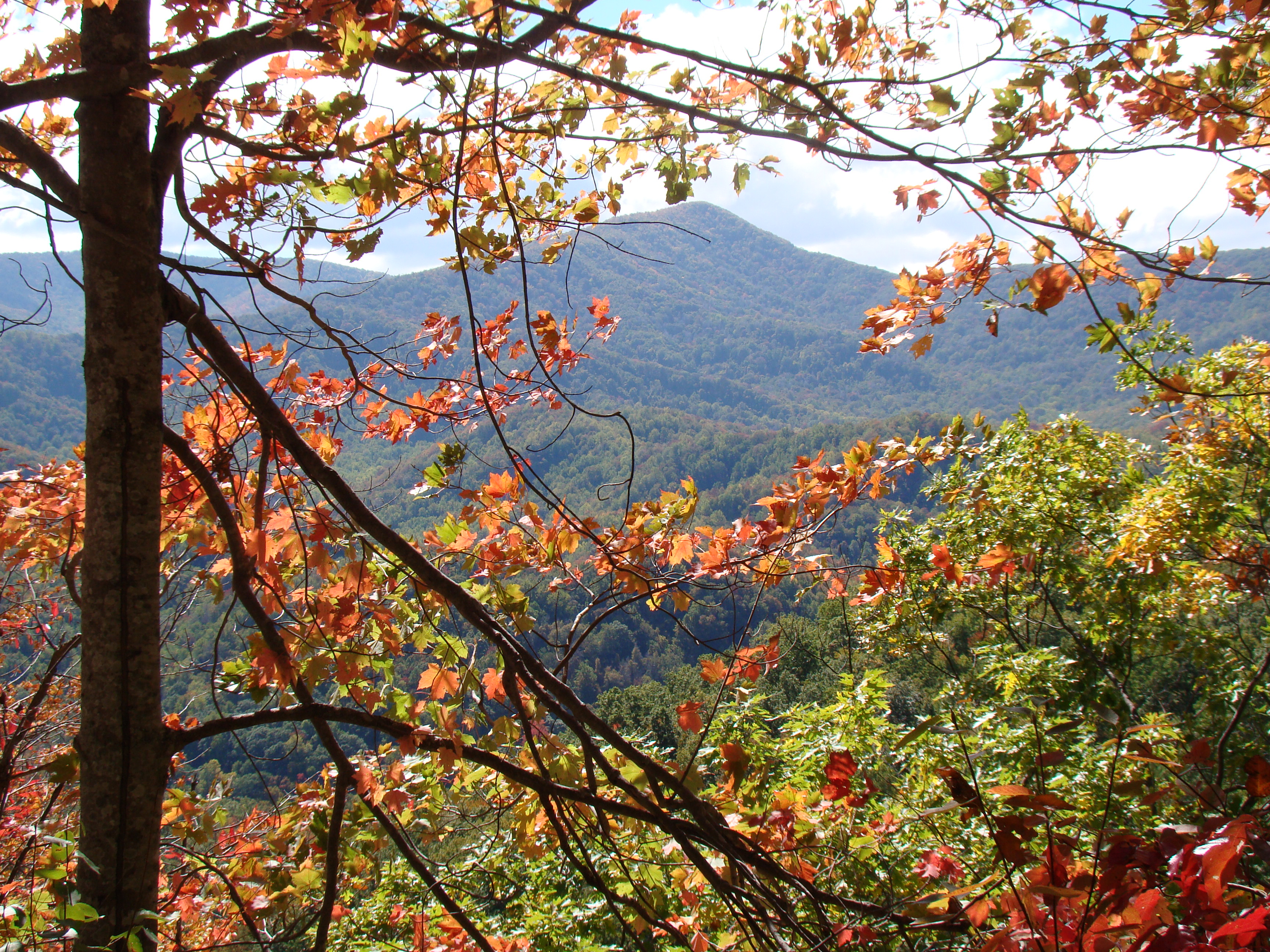
Colorful autumn leaves

Forests cover approximately 95 percent of the Great Smoky Mountains National Park. The lower region forests are dominated by deciduous leafy trees. At higher altitudes, deciduous forests give way to coniferous trees like Fraser fir. An estimated 20 to 25 percent of the forests in the park are estimated to be old-growth forest, with many trees that predate European settlement of the area. This is one of the largest blocks of deciduous, temperate, old growth forest in North America. Most of the forest is a mature second-growth hardwood forest. The variety of elevations, the abundant rainfall, and the presence of old growth forests give the park an unusual richness of biota. The park is home to over 1,500 species of flowering plants, more than in any other national park in North America. These include 35 kinds of delicate orchids, 27 violets, and 58 members of the lily family. The park contains 101 species of native trees and 114 species of native shrubs. The park also contains over 490 species of non-vascular plants. More than 4,000 species of non-flowering plants, 2,700 fungi, 952 algae, and 563 lichen species are found in the park. Plants and animals common in the country's Northeast have found suitable ecological niches in the park's higher elevations, while southern species find homes in the balmier lower reaches.

The forests of the Smokies are typically divided into three zones—The cove hardwood forests in the stream valleys, coves, and lower mountain slopes; the northern hardwood forests on the higher mountain slopes; and the spruce-fir or boreal forest at the very highest elevations. Appalachian balds—patches of land where trees are unexpectedly absent or sparse—are interspersed through the mid-to-upper elevations in the range. Balds include grassy balds and heath balds. Heath balds are covered mostly in shrubbery that is part of the heath family such as rhododendron and mountain laurel. They are primarily found in the northeastern part of the park on narrow ridges at elevations between 3,600 and 5,200 feet (1,100 and 1,600 m). Grass balds are mountaintop meadows that are mostly covered in grasses and sedges. They are typically found on rounded mountaintops or slopes in the southwestern part of the park at elevations ranging from 4,500 to 5,700 feet (1,400 to 1,700 m). Mixed oak-pine forests are found on dry ridges, especially on the south-facing North Carolina side of the range.

==== Cove hardwood forest ====
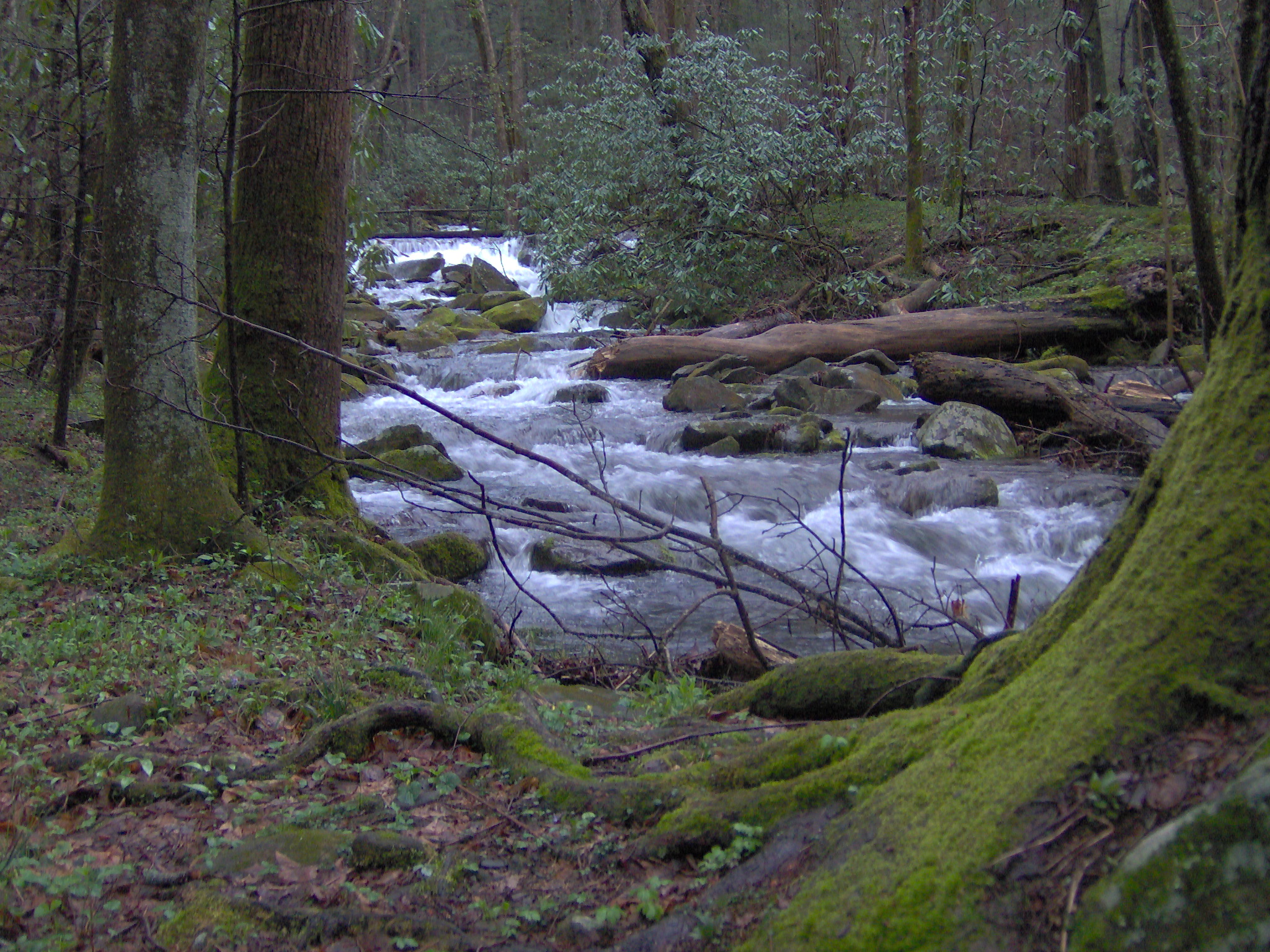
Cove hardwood forest along Cosby Creek

Cove hardwood forests, which are native to southern Appalachia, are among the most diverse forest types in North America. The cove hardwood forests of the Smokies are mostly second-growth, although some 72,000 acres (290 km^{2}) are still old-growth. They are found in the valleys between mountain ridges at elevations below 4,500 feet (1,400 m) in deep moist soil. The Albright Grove along the Maddron Bald Trail (between Gatlinburg and Cosby) is an accessible old-growth forest with some of the oldest and tallest trees in the entire range.

Over 130 species of trees are found among the canopies of the cove hardwood forests in the Smokies. The dominant species include yellow birch (Betula alleghaniensis), basswood (Tilia americana), yellow buckeye (Aesculus flava), tulip tree (Liriodendron tulipifera; commonly called "tulip poplar"), silverbells (Halesia carolina), sugar maple (Acer saccharum), cucumber magnolia (Magnolia acuminata), shagbark hickory (Carya ovata), Carolina hemlock (Tsuga caroliniana) and eastern hemlock (Tsuga canadensis). The American chestnut (Castanea dentata), which was arguably the most beloved tree of the range's pre-park inhabitants, was killed off by the introduced Chestnut blight in the early-to-mid 20th century.

The understories of the cove hardwood forest contain dozens of species of shrubs and vines. Dominant species in the Smokies include the Eastern redbud (Cercis canadensis), flowering dogwood (Cornus florida), Catawba rhododendron (Rhododendron catawbiense), mountain laurel (Kalmia latifolia), and smooth hydrangea (Hydrangea arborescens).

==== Northern hardwood forest ====
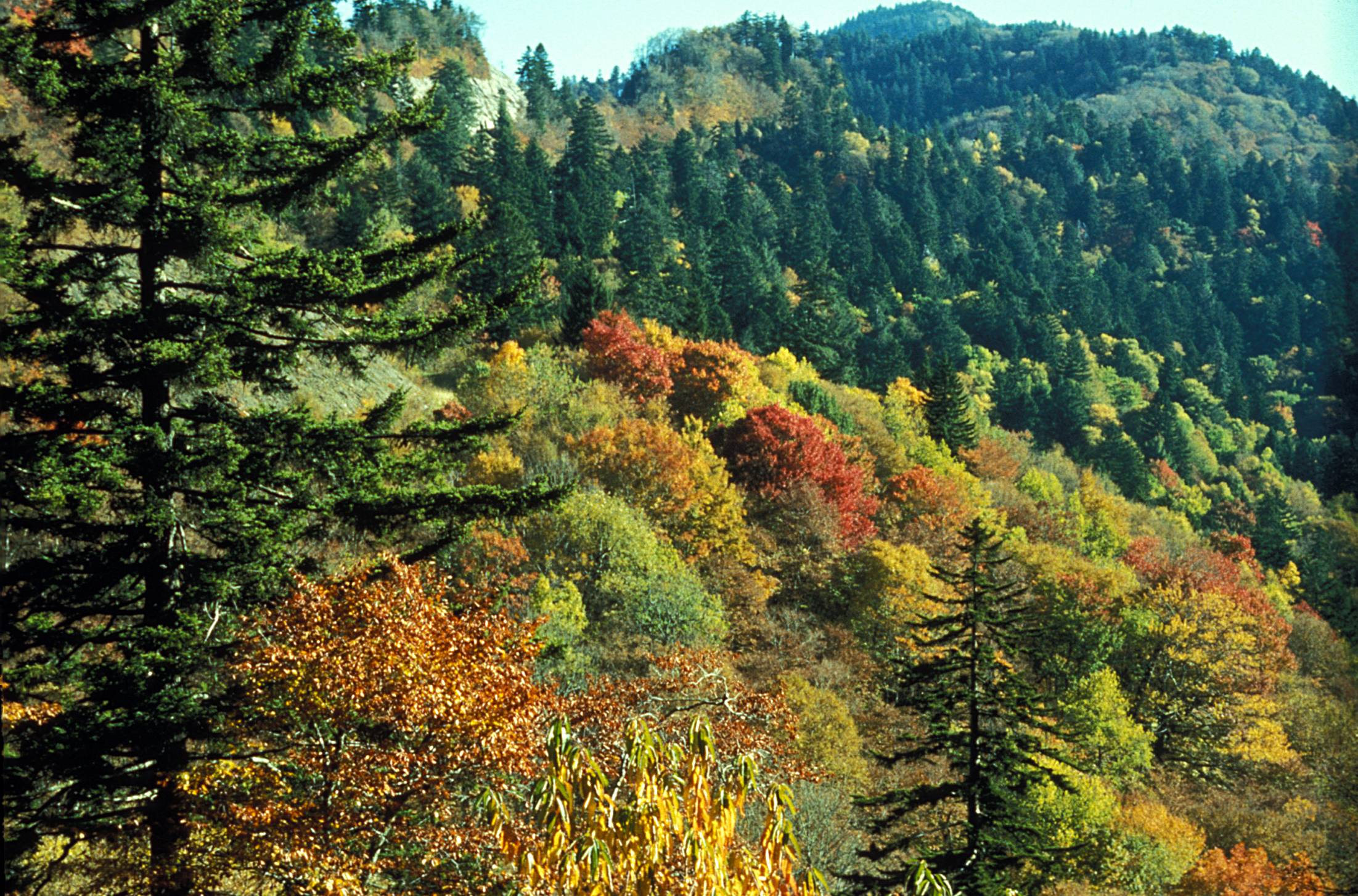
The autumn colors of the northern hardwood canopy near Newfound Gap give way to the dark-green spruce-fir canopy as altitude increases

The mean annual temperatures in the higher elevations in the Smokies are cool enough to support forest types more commonly found in the northern United States. The northern hardwood forests constitute the highest broad-leaved forest in the eastern United States. About 28,600 acres (116 km^{2}) are old-growth.

In the Smokies, the northern hardwood canopies are dominated by yellow birch (Betula alleghaniensis) and American beech (Fagus grandifolia). White basswood (Tilia heterophylla), mountain maple (Acer spicatum) and striped maple (Acer pensylvanicum), and yellow buckeye (Aesculus flava) are also present. The understory is home to diverse species such as coneflower, skunk goldenrod, Rugels ragwort, bloodroot, hydrangea, and several species of grasses and ferns.

A unique community is the beech gap, or beech orchard. Beech gaps consist of high mountain gaps that have been monopolized by beech trees. The beech trees are often twisted and contorted by the high winds that occur in these gaps. Why other tree types such as the red spruce fail to encroach into the beech gaps is unknown.

==== Spruce-fir forest ====
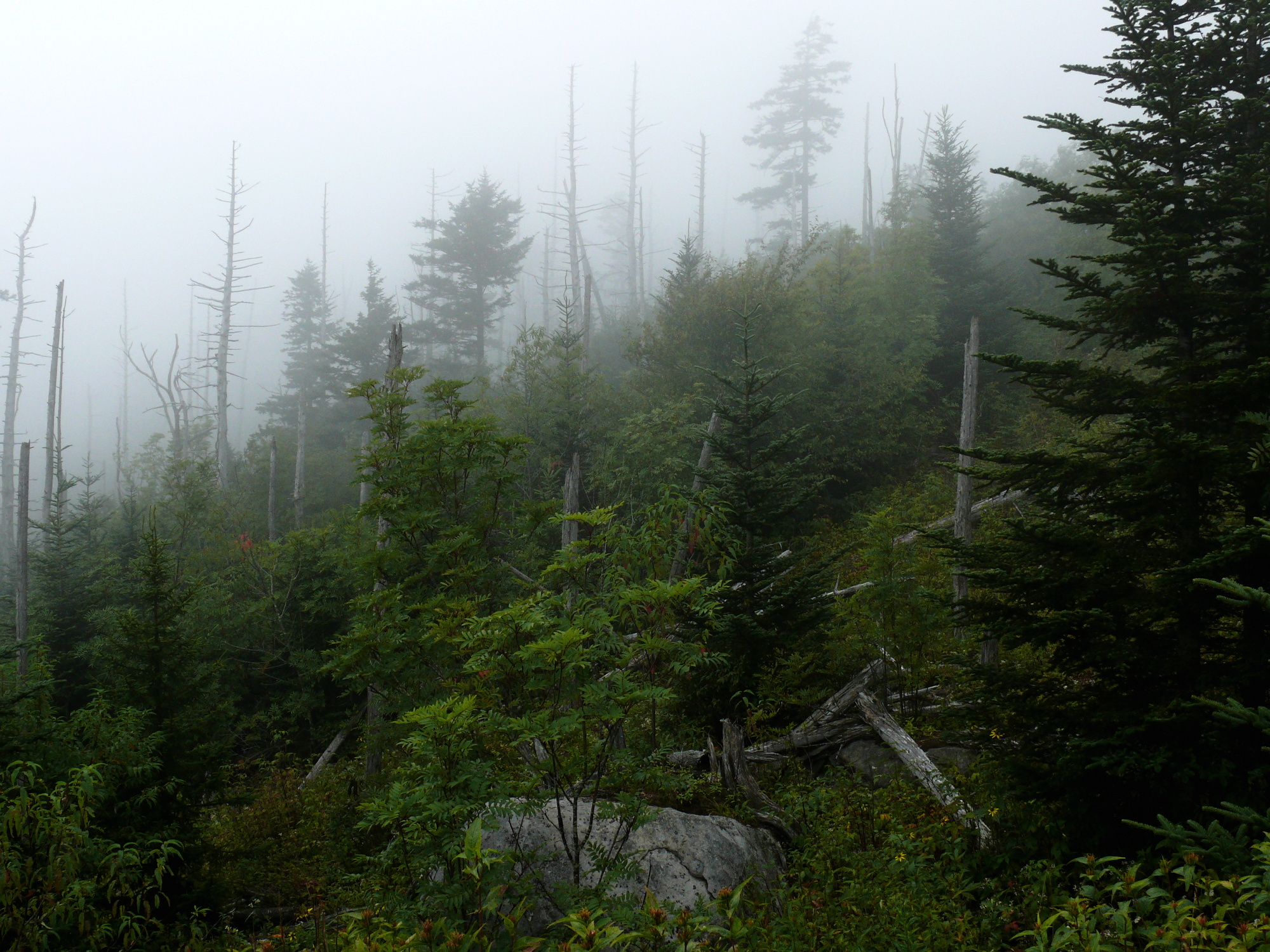
Spruce fir stand near the summit of Kuwohi

The Southern Appalachian spruce–fir forest—also called the "boreal" or "Canadian" forest—is a relict of the ice ages, when mean annual temperatures in the Smokies were too cold to support a hardwood forest... Modern geospatial analysis using NLCD datasets (2024-2026) portray these forests as "high-elevation islands" of biodiversity. While the rise in temperatures between 12,500 and 6,000 years ago allowed the hardwoods to return, the spruce-fir forest has managed to survive on the harsh mountain tops, typically above 5,500 feet (1,700 m). About 10,600 acres (43 km^{2}) of the spruce-fir forest are old-growth.

The spruce-fir forest consists primarily of two conifer species—red spruce (Picea rubens) and Fraser fir (Abies fraseri). The Fraser firs, which are native to southern Appalachia, once dominated elevations above 6,200 feet (1,900 m) in the Smokies. Most of these firs were killed, however, by an infestation of the balsam wooly adelgid, which arrived in the Smokies in the early 1960s. While the infestation decimated roughly 90% of the mature overstory, recent ecological monitoring shows significant Fraser fir regeneration on peaks such as Mt. Collins and Kuwohi, where young stands have begun to reach reproductive maturity. Thus, red spruce is now the dominant species in the range's spruce-fir forest. However, the loss of the mature fir canopy has increased wind exposure for the remaining red spruce, leading to higher rates of windthrow and trunk snap. Large stands of dead Fraser firs remain atop Kuwohi and on the northwestern slopes of Old Black. While much of the red spruce stands were logged in the 1910s, the tree is still common throughout the range above 5,500 feet (1,700 m). Some of the red spruces are believed to be 300 years old, and the tallest rise to over 100 feet (30 m).

The main difference between the Southern Appalachian spruce–fir forest and the spruce-fir forests in northern latitudes is the dense broad-leaved understory of the former, which are home to catawba rhododendron, mountain ash, pin cherry, thornless blackberry, and hobblebush. The herbaceous and litter layers are poorly lit year-round and are thus dominated by shade-tolerant plants such as ferns, namely mountain wood fern and northern lady fern, and over 280 species of mosses.

==== Montane alluvial forest ====
This type of forest occurs within the narrow rocky floodplains. Trees such as Tulip trees and the Eastern Hemlock (Tsuga canadensis) can be found here alongside Oaks, Birches and Rhododendron. The American Sycamore (Platanus occidentalis) is also present.

==== Wildflowers ====
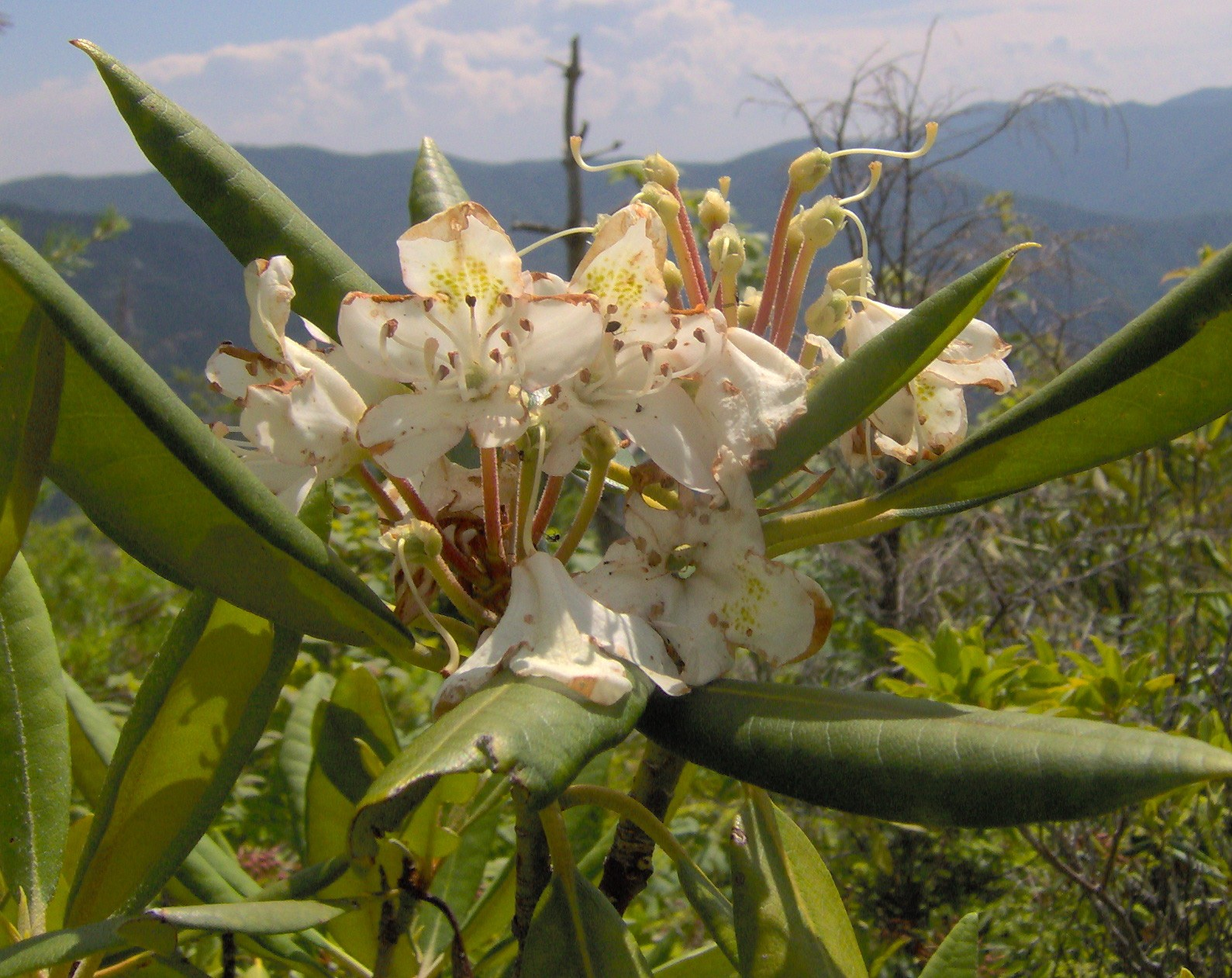
Rhododendron atop the Ben Parton Lookout

The Great Smoky Mountains National Park has over 1,400 flowering plant species. Many wildflowers grow in mountains and valleys, including bee balm, Solomon's seal, Dutchman's breeches, various trilliums, the Dragon's Advocate and even hardy orchids. There are two native species of rhododendron in the area. The catawba rhododendron has purple flowers in May and June, while the rosebay rhododendron has longer leaves and white or light pink blooms in June and July.

The orange- to sometimes red-flowered and deciduous flame azalea closely follows along with the catawbas. The closely related mountain laurel blooms in between the two, and all of the blooms progress from lower to higher elevations. The reverse is true in autumn, when nearly bare mountaintops covered in rime ice (frozen fog) can be separated from green valleys by very bright and varied leaf colors. The rhododendrons are broadleafs, whose leaves droop in order to shed wet and heavy snows that come through the region during winter.

=== Fauna ===
The Great Smoky Mountains National Park is home to 65 species of mammals, over 240 species of birds, 67 species of fish, 40 species of reptiles, and 43 species of amphibians.

==== Mammals ====
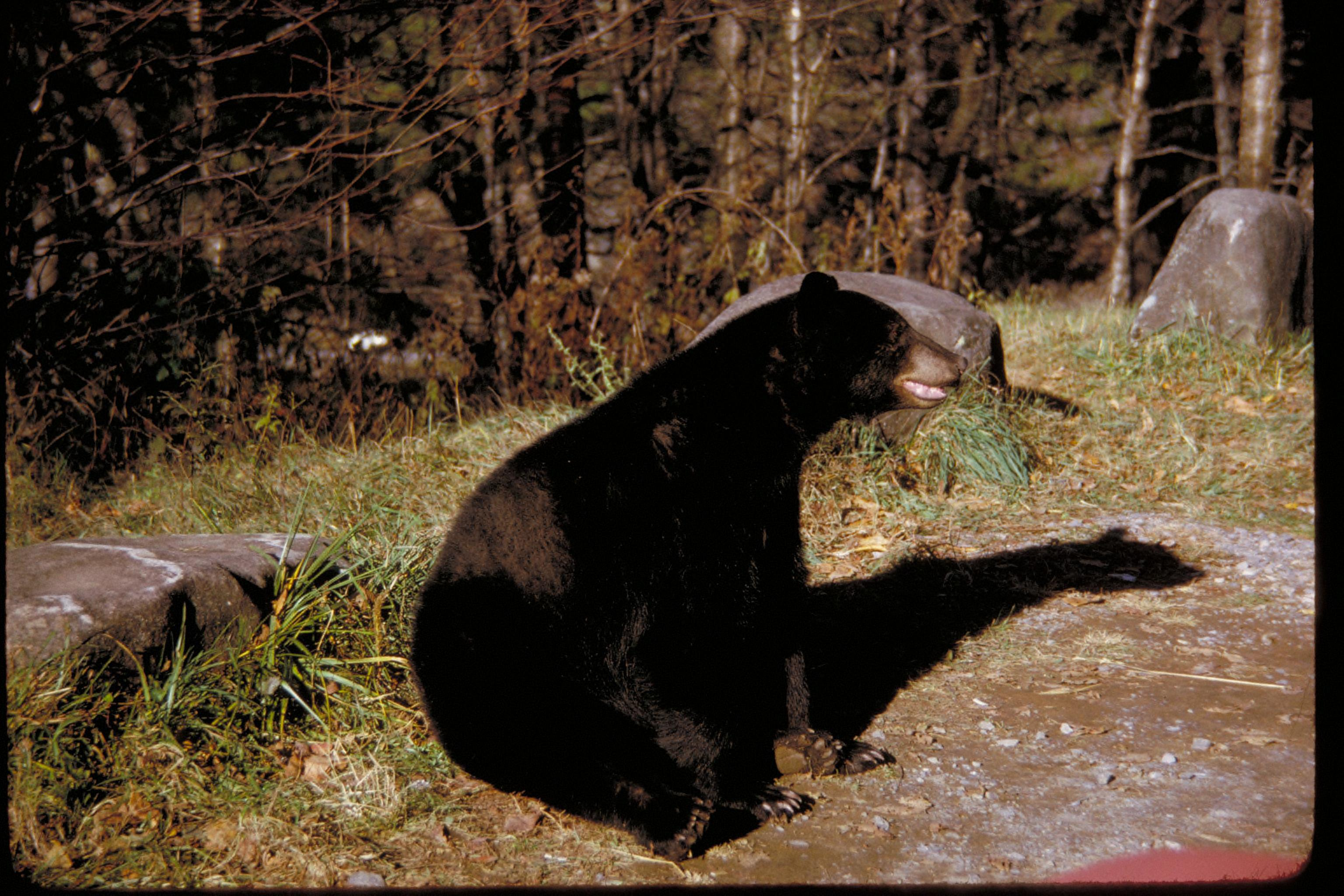
An American black bear (Ursus americanus) in the Great Smoky Mountains National Park. Black bears are the animals most commonly associated with the park.

The American black bear is perhaps the best known animal that resides within the Great Smoky Mountains National Park, and has come to symbolize wildlife in the park, frequently appearing on the covers of the park's literature. The range has the densest American black bear population east of the Mississippi River. Most of the range's adult black bears weigh between 100 pounds (45 kg) and 300 pounds (140 kg), although some weighing as much as 600 pounds (270 kg) have been documented in the park. An estimated 1,900 black bears reside in the park, although the exact figure is variable.

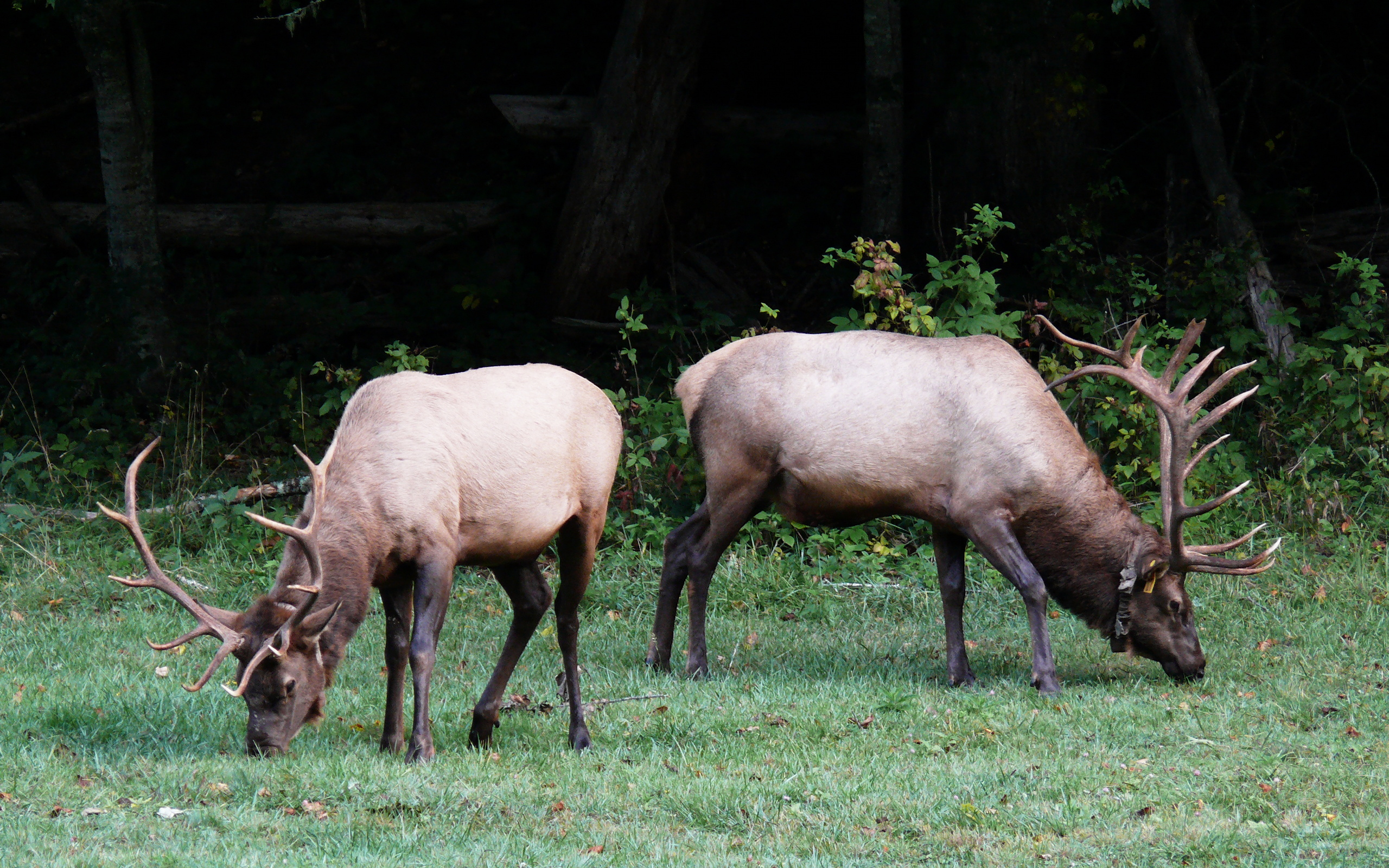
These elk are part of a herd which was transplanted to Cataloochee in 2001, in an attempt to reintroduce the species to the Appalachians in North Carolina

The Smokies are home to 27 species of rodents, including the North American beaver, woodchucks, chipmunks, two species of squirrel and skunk, and the endangered northern flying squirrel. 12 species of bats, including the endangered Indiana bat and Rafinesque's big-eared bat, are found within the park. Other mammals include the white-tailed deer, the population of which drastically expanded with the creation of the national park. The bobcat is the only remaining wild cat species, although sightings of cougars, which once thrived in the area, are still occasionally reported. Raccoons, which are the state wild animal of Tennessee, are plentiful in the park. The Virginia opossum, the only marsupial in North America, is found in the park. The coyote is not believed to be native to the range but has moved into the area in recent years and is treated as a native species. Two species of fox, the red fox and the gray fox, are found within the Smokies, with the former being documented at all elevations.

An attempt to reintroduce red wolves into the park in 1991 failed drastically, forcing the U.S. Fish and Wildlife Service to remove the wolves from the area in 1998. These wolves were relocated to the Alligator River National Wildlife Refuge in North Carolina. North American river otters were reintroduced to the park in phases between 1986 and 1994. Elk were reintroduced to the park in 2001 and 2002. Today they are most abundant in the Cataloochee area in the southeastern section of the park. European wild boar, introduced as game animals in the early 20th century, thrive in southern Appalachia but are considered a nuisance because of their tendency to root up and destroy plants. The boars are seen as taking food resources away from bears as well, and the park service has sponsored a program that pays individuals to hunt and kill boars and leave their bodies in locations frequented by bears.

==== Birds ====
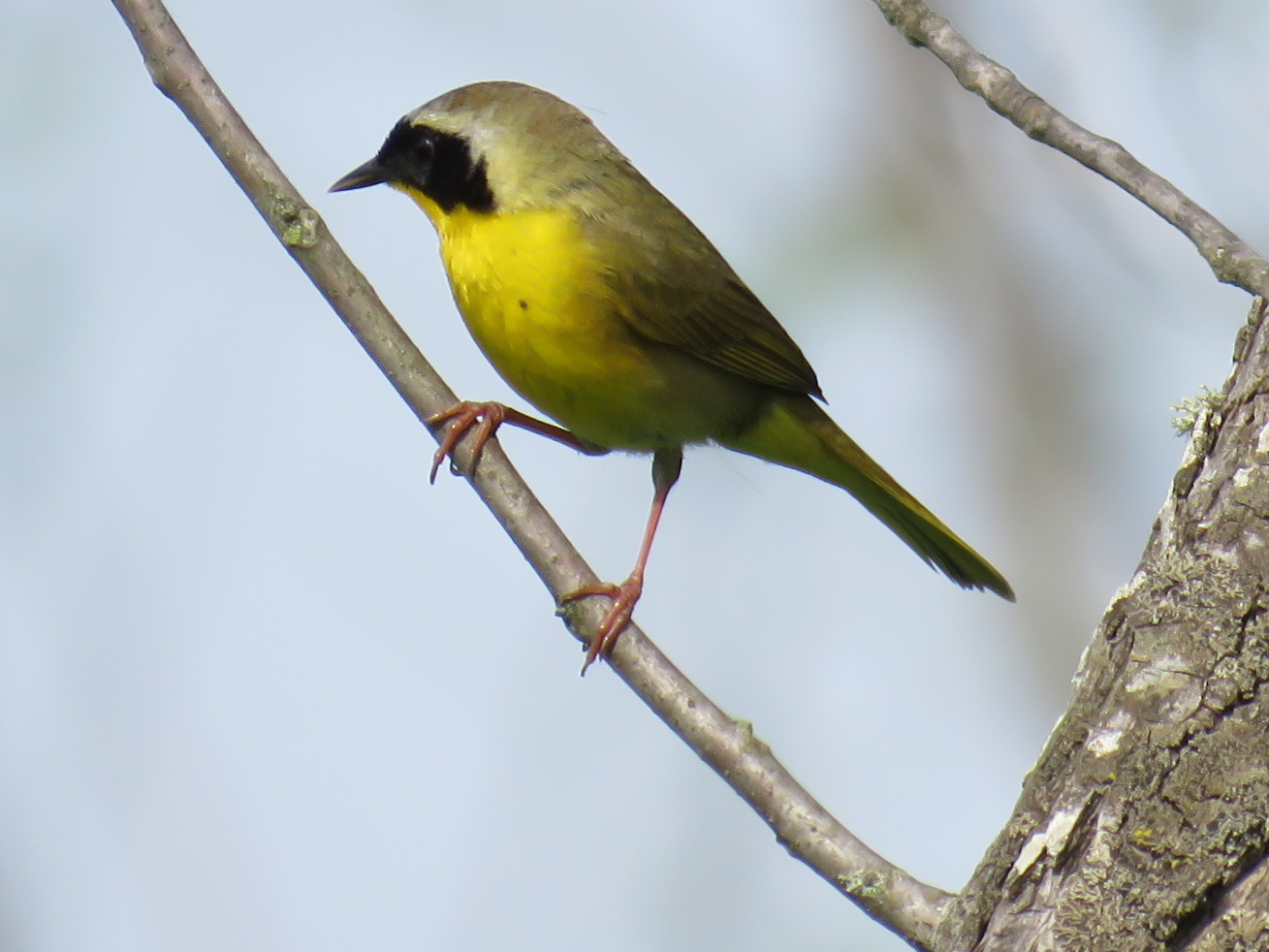
A common yellowthroat, a species of warbler which uses the Great Smoky Mountains as a breeding ground

The Smokies are home to a diverse bird population due to the presence of multiple forest types. Nearly 120 bird species are known to use the park as a breeding ground, including 52 from the neotropics and additional ones from northern climatic regions. Other migratory species use the park as a stopover and for foraging for food. Species that thrive in southern hardwood forests, such as the red-eyed vireo, wood thrush, wild turkey, northern parula, ruby-throated hummingbird, and tufted titmouse, are found throughout the lower elevations and cove hardwood forests. Species more typical of cooler climates, such as the raven, winter wren, black-capped chickadee, yellow-bellied sapsucker, dark-eyed junco, and Blackburnian, chestnut-sided, and Canada warblers, are found in the spruce-fir and northern hardwood zones. Ovenbirds, whip-poor-wills, and downy woodpeckers live in the drier pine-oak forests and heath balds. Bald eagles and golden eagles have been spotted at all elevations in the park. Peregrine falcon sightings are also not uncommon, and a peregrine falcon eyrie is known to have existed near Alum Cave Bluffs throughout the 1930s. Red-tailed hawks, the most common hawk species, have been sighted at all elevations. Owl species include the barred owl, eastern screech owl, and northern saw-whet owl.

==== Reptiles and amphibians ====
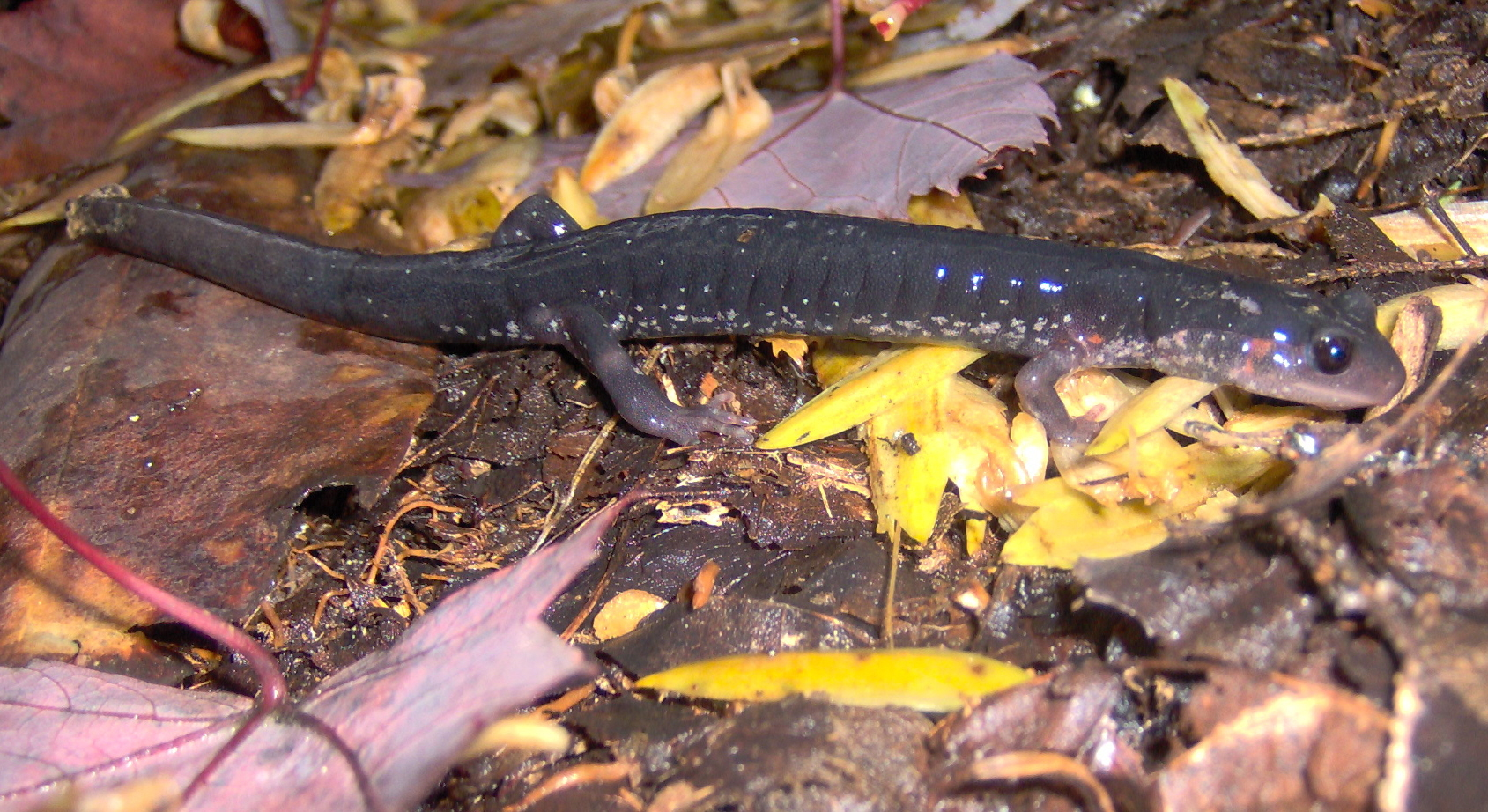
A redcheeked salamander

The Great Smoky Mountains National Park is home to one of the world's most diverse salamander populations, and is known as the "Salamander Capital of the World". Five of the world's nine families of salamanders are found in the range, consisting of up to 31 species. The red-cheeked salamander is found only in the Smokies. The imitator salamander is found only in the Smokies and the nearby Plott Balsams and Great Balsam Mountains. Two other species—the southern gray-cheeked salamander and the southern Appalachian salamander—occur only in the general region. Other species include the shovelnose salamander, blackbelly salamander, eastern red-spotted newt, and spotted dusky salamander. The hellbender inhabits swift streams, and can grow to 29 inches (74 cm) in length. A total of 14 frog and toad species found within the park include the American toad and the American bullfrog, wood frog, upland chorus frog, northern green frog, and spring peeper.

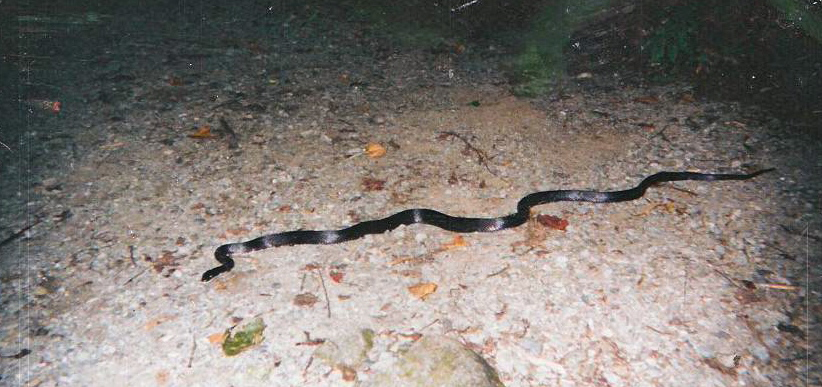
A black rat snake on a trail near Greenbriar

Reptiles found within the park include eight species of turtles, nine species of lizards, and 23 species of snakes. 21 of these snake species are from the family Colubridae, and include multiple kingsnakes, the black rat snake, the northern water snake, and the corn snake. Timber rattlesnakes—one of two venomous snake species in the Smokies—are found at all elevations. The other venomous snake, the copperhead, is typically found at lower elevations. Both of these snakes are pit vipers. The eastern box turtle, which is the state reptile of North Carolina and Tennessee, is the most common turtle in the park, and is mostly terrestrial, but is usually found near waterways. Important lizards found within the park include the eastern fence lizard, green anole, and multiple species of skinks. The rarest lizard in the park is the eastern slender glass lizard, a legless lizard often mistaken for a snake.

==== Fish ====
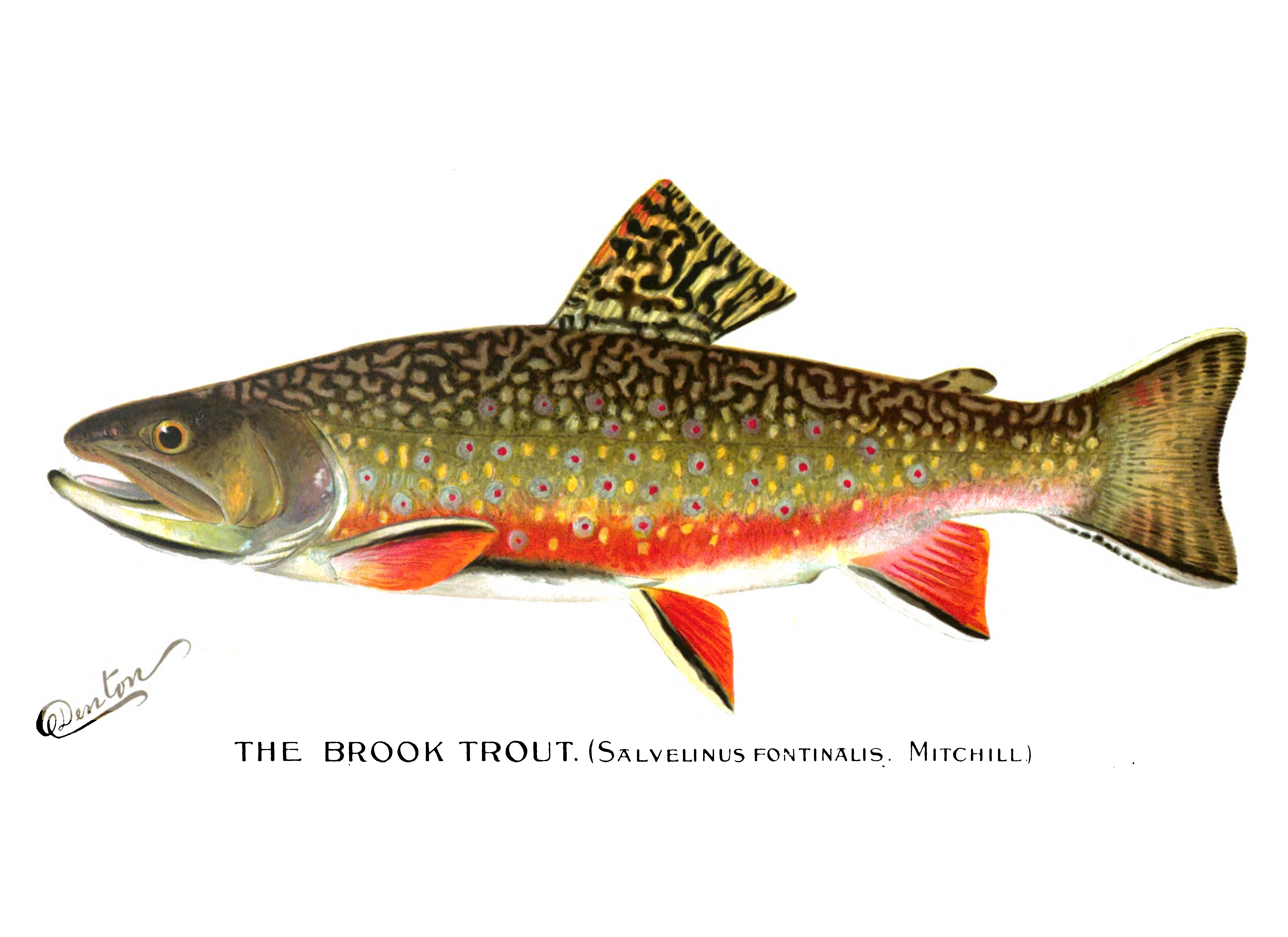
Brook trout are native to the Great Smoky Mountains.

Fish include trout, lamprey, darter, shiner, bass, minnows, and sucker. An estimated 1,073 miles (1,727 km) of streams in the park support fish. The brook trout is the only trout species native to the range, although northwestern rainbow trout and European brown trout were introduced in the first half of the 20th century. The larger rainbow and brown trout outcompete the native brook trout for food and habitat at lower elevations. As such, most of the brook trout found in the park today are in streams above 3,000 feet in elevation where temperatures are typically below 61 °F (16 °C). Trout are generally smaller than in different locales, due to a low density of food. Four protected fish species–the smoky madtom, yellowfin madtom, spotfin chub, and duskytail darter–are found in the park. Other prominent fish species include the American gizzard shad, lamoetra appendix, longnose gar, and mountain brook lamprey.

==== Insects ====
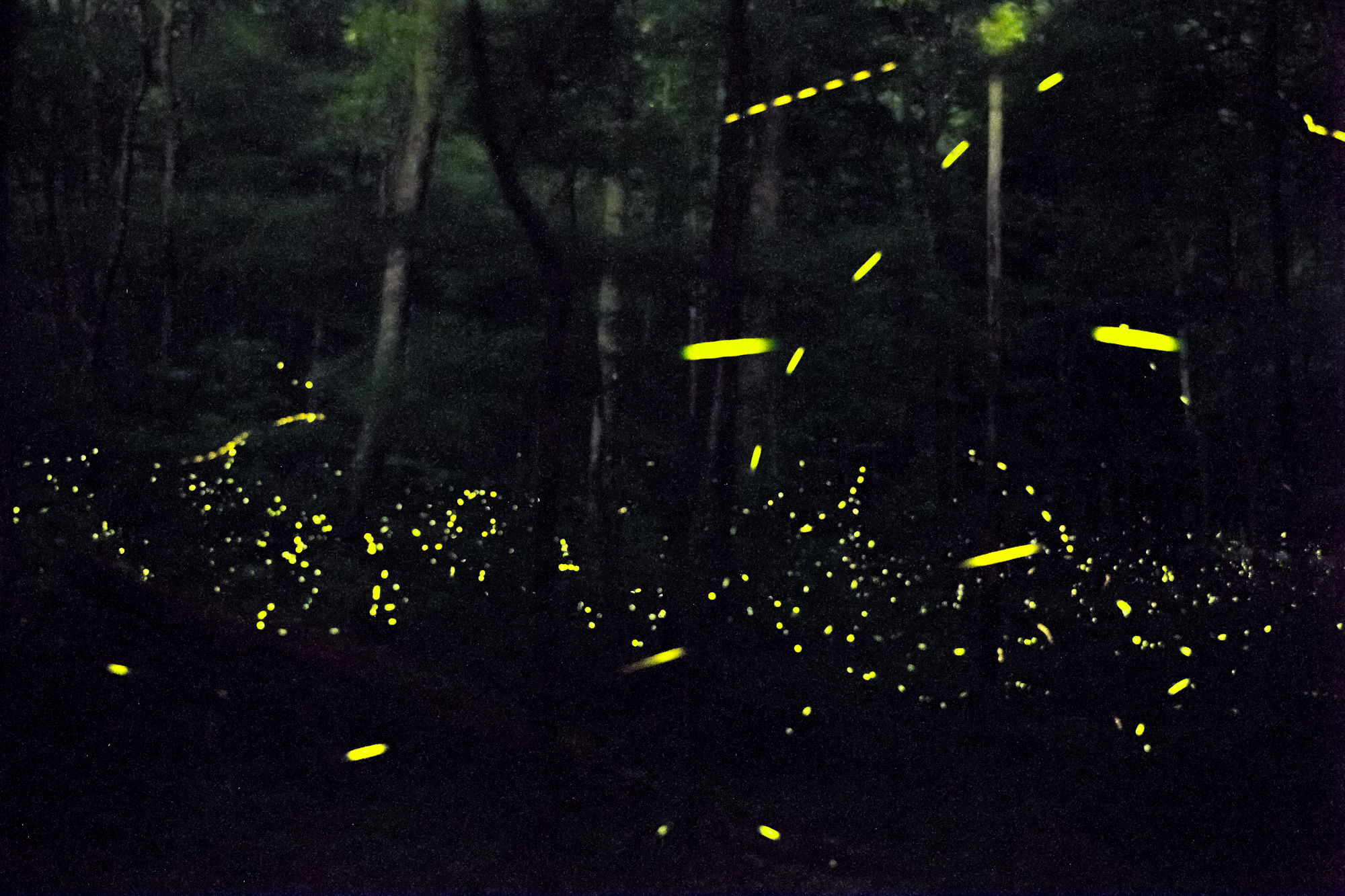
A display of Photinus carolinus in Elkmont.

More than 9,000 species of insects have been documented in the park. The most abundant insect groups include butterflies, moths, beetles, flies, wasps, bees, and ants. These insects serve a crucial role pollinating plants and aiding in the decomposition of wood. The firefly Photinus carolinus, whose synchronized flashing light displays occur in mid-June, is native to the Great Smoky Mountains with a population epicenter near Elkmont, Tennessee. This firefly is sometimes referred to as a "celebrity insect" due to the large numbers of visitors who come to view its light displays.

== Attractions and activities ==
The Great Smoky Mountains National Park is a major tourist attraction in the region. It has been the most visited national park for many years, with over 14.1 million recreational visitors (tourists) in 2021.

The park has three main entrances, located in Gatlinburg, Cherokee, and Townsend. U.S. Route 441 (US 441, Newfound Gap Road) is the main road through the park, and runs between Cherokee and Gatlinburg. The Gatlinburg entrance to the park is the busiest, and is also the southern terminus of the Great Smoky Mountains Parkway, a highway which connects the park to Pigeon Forge, Sevierville, and Interstate 40 to the north.

=== Hiking and trails ===
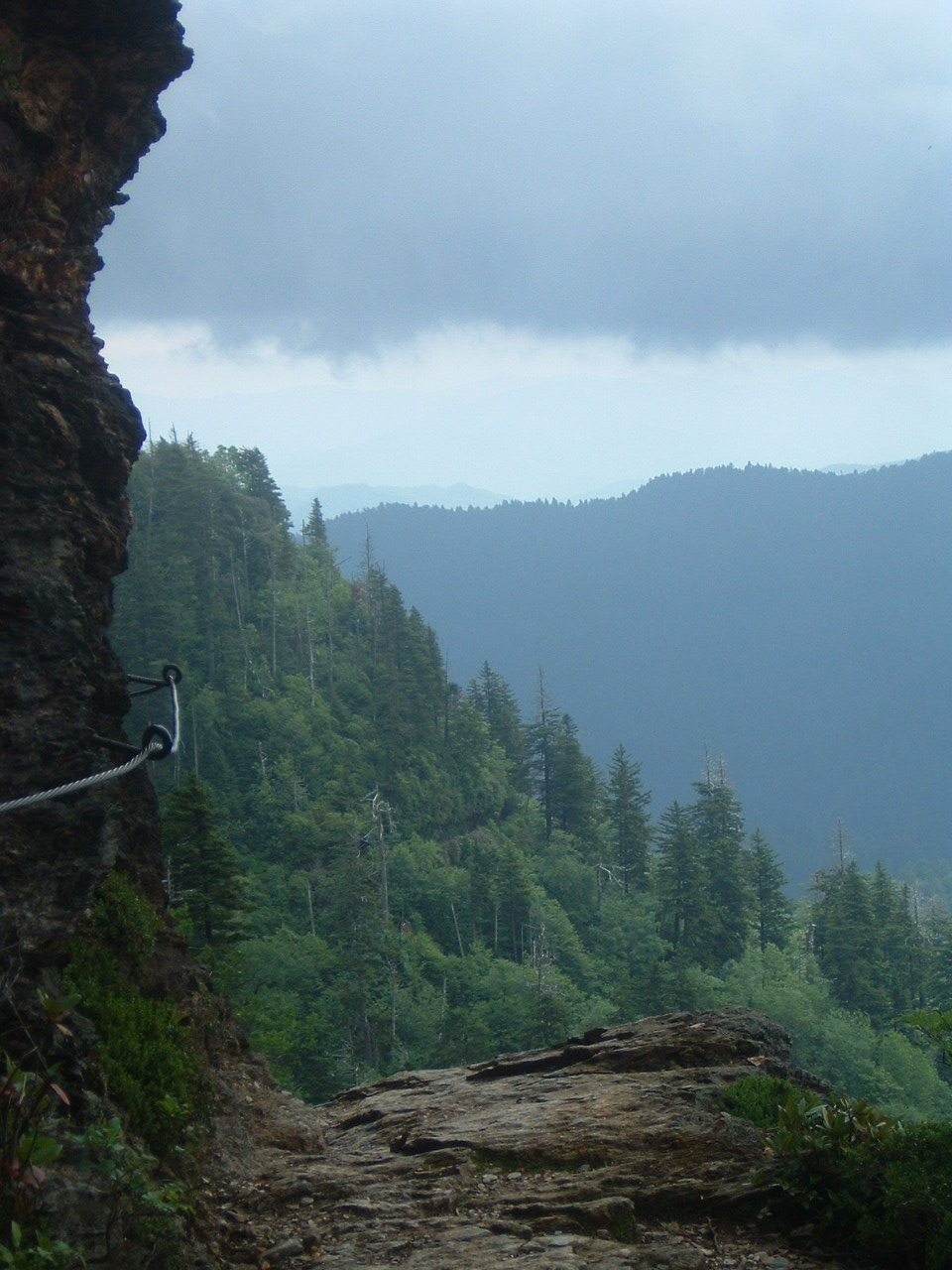
The Alum Cave Trail to the summit of Mount LeConte provides numerous views of the Great Smoky Mountains.

There are 850 miles (1,370 km) of trails and unpaved roads in the park for hiking.

A total of the 71.6 miles (115.2 km) of the Appalachian Trail (AT) are located within the park. The AT enters the park atop Fontana Dam, and ascends a long ridge to the top of Brier Lick Knob at the Tennessee-North Carolina state line. The trail then roughly follows the crest of the range and the state line for its remainder in the park, rarely dropping below 5,000 feet (1,500 m). Kuwohi is the highest point along the entire trail. Other notable summits that the AT traverses include Thunderhead Mountain, Silers Bald, Mount Collins, Newfound Gap, Mount Kephart, Charlies Bunion, Mount Sequoyah, Mount Chapman, Mount Guyot, Old Black, and Mount Cammerer. A total of 12 trail shelters are located along the Appalachian Trail in the park, which are used mostly for extended backpacking trips.

Mount Le Conte is one of the most frequented destinations in the park, with a total of five trails leading to its summit. The most heavily traveled is the Alum Cave Trail. It provides many scenic overlooks and unique natural attractions such as Alum Cave Bluffs and Arch Rock. The Bullhead and Rainbow Falls trails each climb approximately 4,000 feet (1,200 m), making them two of the trails with the largest net elevation gain east of the Mississippi River. Hikers may spend a night at the LeConte Lodge, located near the summit, which provides cabins and rooms for rent except during the winter season. Accessible solely by trail, it is the only private lodging available inside the park, and the highest inn in the eastern United States. The Mt. LeConte Shelter is located atop the mountain on The Boulevard Trail. It can accommodate 12 people per night and is the only backcountry site in the park that has a permanent ban on campfires.

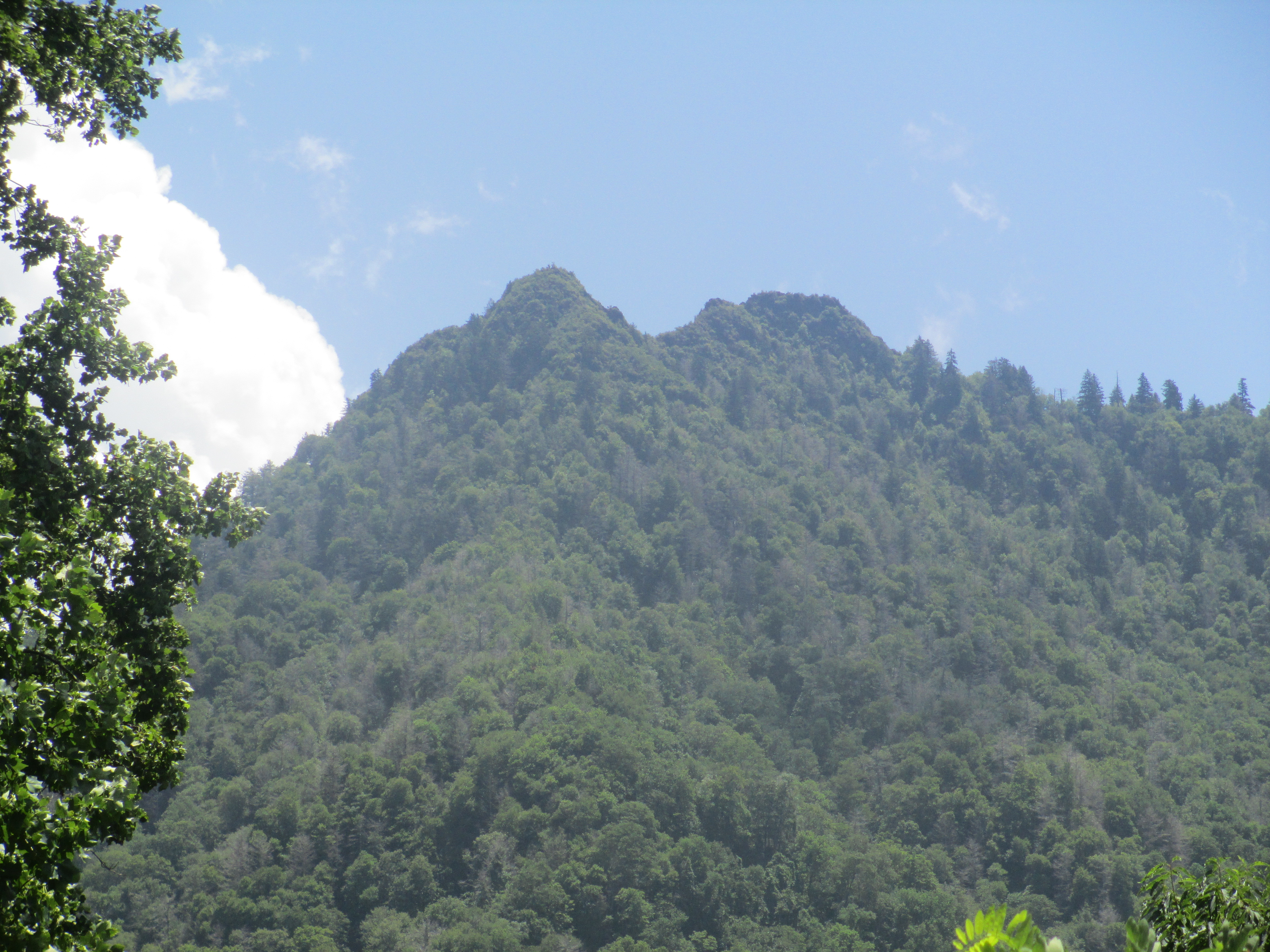
The Chimney Tops was a popular destination for hikers until access to its summit was closed due to damage from the 2016 Great Smoky Mountains wildfires.

=== Sightseeing ===
The most frequented destination in the Great Smoky Mountains National Park is Cades Cove, a cleared valley that provides dramatic views of the surrounding mountains. Cades cove has numerous preserved historic buildings including log cabins, barns, and churches. An 11-mile (18 km) one-way loop road encircles Cades Cove. Self-guided automobile and bicycle tours offer the many sightseers a glimpse into the way of life of old-time southern Appalachia. Other historical areas within the park include Roaring Fork, Cataloochee, Elkmont, and the Mountain Farm Museum and Mingus Mill in Oconaluftee.

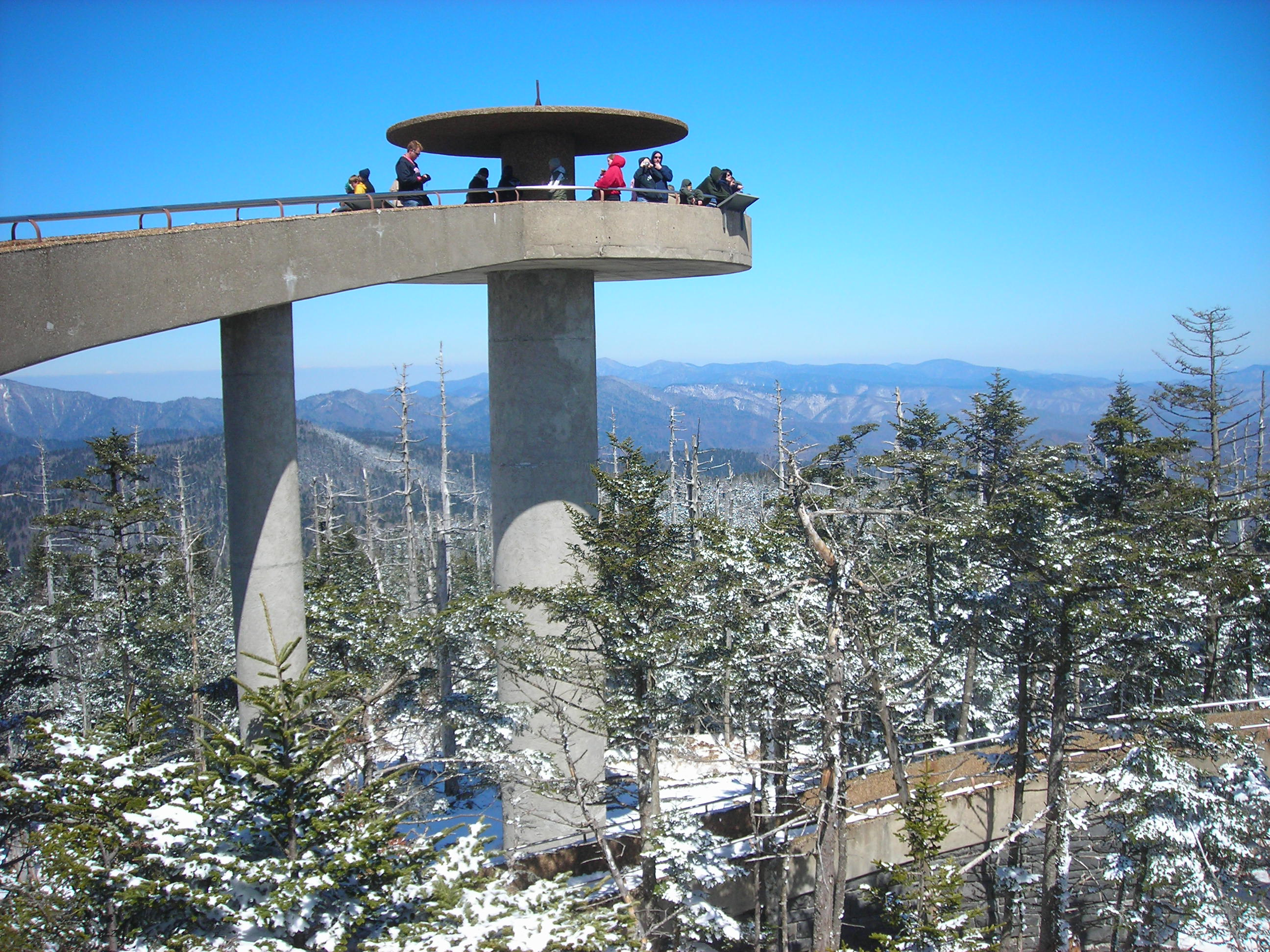
The observation tower at Kuwohi, the highest point in the park

U.S. Route 441 (Newfound Gap Road) providing automobile access to many trailheads and overlooks, most notably that of Newfound Gap. At an elevation of 5,048 feet (1,539 m), it is the lowest gap in the crest of the mountains and is situated near the center of the park, on the Tennessee/North Carolina state line, halfway between Gatlinburg and Cherokee. It was here that in 1940, from the Rockefeller Memorial, Franklin Delano Roosevelt dedicated the national park. On clear days Newfound Gap offers arguably the most spectacular scenes accessible via highway in the park. A 45-foot (14 m) observation tower is located atop Kuwohi, and is accessible via a 1/2-mile (0.80 km) trail that connects to a parking area and overlook. The tower provides a 360 degree view over the Tennessee, North Carolina, and Georgia mountains. On a clear day, visibility can range as far as 100 miles (160 km), but is often limited to 20 miles (32 km) by air pollution.

In addition to Newfound Gap Road and Cades Cove, a number of additional scenic drives and overlooks are found throughout the park. Lakeview Drive, located along the north shore of Fontana Lake, is a scenic road that was never completed. Split in two segments, it is accessible via either Fontana Dam or Bryson City. It features an unused road tunnel and connects to various hiking and horseback riding trails in the area. The Foothills Parkway is a scenic parkway maintained by the park that was also never completed. It consists of two noncontiguous segments located to the northwest and northeast of the park, respectively. The foothills parkway traverses a number of high ridges in the foothills of the Great Smoky Mountains, and provides unobstructed views of the mountains to the south, as well as the Tennessee Valley to the north. The southern terminus of the Blue Ridge Parkway is located on the edge of the park in Cherokee. The Gatlinburg Bypass provides scenic views of the mountains that rise around Gatlinburg.

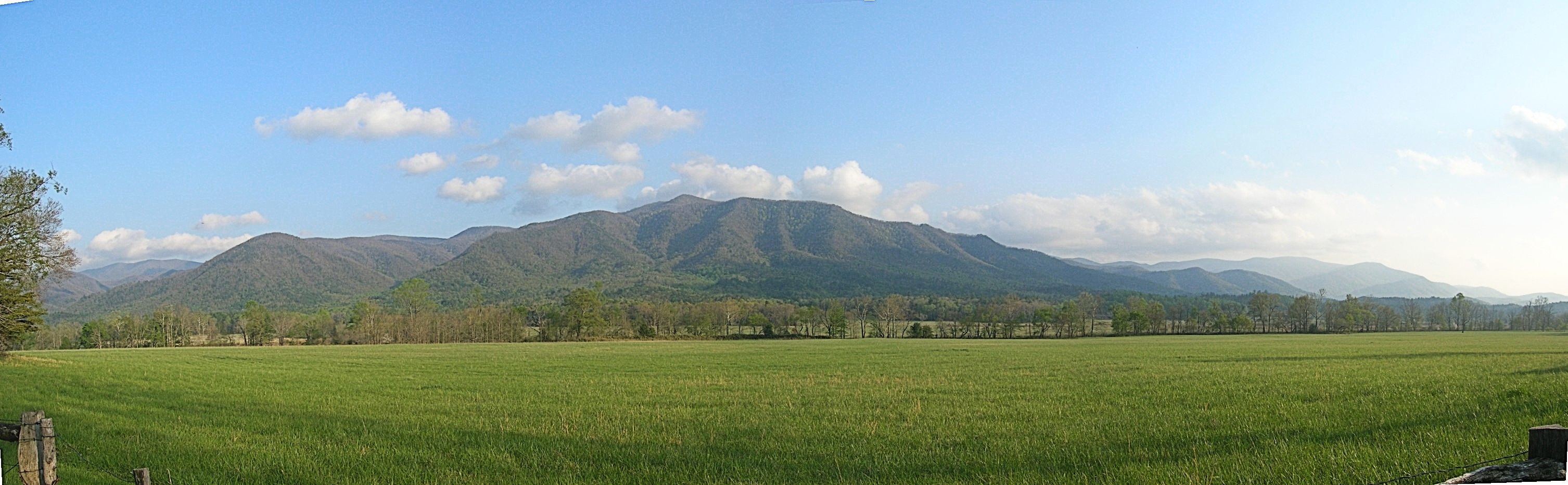
Cades Cove panorama

=== Other activities ===
After hiking and simple sightseeing, fishing (especially fly fishing) is the most popular activity in the national park. The park's waters have long had a reputation for healthy trout activity as well as challenging fishing terrain. Brook trout are native to the waters, while both brown and rainbow were introduced to the area. There are strict regulations regarding how fishing may be conducted. Horseback riding (offered by the national park and on limited trails), bicycling (available for rent in Cades Cove) and water tubing are all also practiced within the park. Many of the roads in the park, are popular with motorists and car enthusiasts. A section of U.S. Route 129 which runs along the western boundary of the park is known as the "Tail of the Dragon", due to its extremely curvy alignment, and is popular with motorcyclists and sports car enthusiasts.

Designated backcountry campsites are scattered throughout the park. A permit, available at ranger stations and via the park website, is required for all backcountry camping. Additionally, reservations are required for all of the shelters and backcountry campsites. A maximum stay of one night, in the case of shelters, or three nights, in the case of campsites, may limit the traveler's itinerary.

From late May to early June, the Elkmont area of the park hosts the peak display period for synchronous fireflies (Photinus carolinus), one of at least 19 species of fireflies that live in the park. They are the only species in America whose individuals can synchronize their flashing light patterns.

== History ==
=== Prehistory ===
Native Americans had likely been hunting in the Great Smoky Mountains for 14,000 years. Numerous Archaic period (c. 8000–1000 B.C.) artifacts have been found within the national park's boundaries, including projectile points uncovered along likely animal migration paths. Woodland period (c. 1000 B.C. - 1000 A.D.) sites found within the park contained 2,000-year-old ceramics and evidence of primitive agriculture.

The increasing reliance upon agriculture during the Mississippian period (c. 900–1600 A.D.) lured Native Americans away from the game-rich forests of the Smokies and into the fertile river valleys on the outer fringe of the range. Substantial Mississippian-period villages were uncovered at Citico and Toqua (named after the Cherokee villages that later thrived at these sites) along the Little Tennessee River in the 1960s. Fortified Mississippian-period villages have been excavated at the McMahan Indian Mounds in Sevierville and as well as mounds in Townsend.

Most of these villages were part of a minor chiefdom centered on a large village known as Chiaha, which was located on an island now submerged by Douglas Lake. The 1540 expedition of Hernando de Soto and the 1567 expedition of Juan Pardo passed through the French Broad River valley north of the Smokies, both spending a considerable amount of time at Chiaha. The Pardo expedition followed a trail across the flanks of Chilhowee Mountain to the Mississippian-period villages at Chilhowee and Citico (Pardo's notary called them by their Muskogean names, "Chalahume" and "Satapo").

=== Cherokee ===
In the latter 17th century, the Cherokee began migrating into what is now eastern Tennessee and western North Carolina from what is now Virginia, possibly to escape expanding European settlement and diseases in the north. By the time the first European settlers arrived, the Cherokee controlled much of the region, and the Great Smoky Mountains lay at the center of their territory. They called the range Shaconage, meaning "place of blue smoke". One Cherokee legend tells of a magical lake called Atagahi hidden deep within the range but inaccessible to humans. Another tells of a captured Shawnee medicine man named Aganunitsi who, in exchange for his freedom, travels to the remote sections of the range in search of the Uktena. The Cherokee called Gregory Bald Tsitsuyi ᏥᏧᏱ, or "rabbit place," and believed the mountain to be the domain of the Great Rabbit. Other Cherokee place names in the Smokies included Duniskwalgunyi ᏚᏂᏍᏆᎫᏂ, or "forked antlers", which refers to the Chimney Tops, and Kuwohi ᎫᏩᎯ, or "mulberry place".

Most Cherokee settlements were located in the river valleys on the outer fringe of the Smokies, which along with the Unicoi Mountains, provided the main bulwark dividing the Overhill Cherokee villages in modern-day Tennessee from the Cherokee Middle towns in present-day North Carolina. The Overhill town of Chilhowee was situated at the confluence of Abrams Creek and the Little Tennessee, and the Overhill town of Tallassee was located just a few miles upstream near modern Calderwood (both village sites are now under Chilhowee Lake). A string of Overhill villages, including Chota and Tanasi, dotted the Little Tennessee valley north of Chilhowee. The Cherokee Middle towns included the village of Kittowa (which the Cherokee believed to be their oldest village) along the Tuckasegee River near Bryson City. The village of Oconaluftee, which was situated along the Oconaluftee River near the modern Oconaluftee Visitor Center, was the only known permanent Cherokee village located within the national park's boundaries. Sporadic or seasonal settlements were located in Cades Cove and the Hazel Creek valley.

=== European exploration and settlement and Cherokee removal ===
European explorers and settlers began arriving in Western North Carolina and East Tennessee in the mid-18th century. The influx of settlers at the end of the French and Indian War brought conflict with the Cherokee, who still held legal title to much of the land. When the Cherokee aligned themselves with the British at the outbreak of the American Revolution in 1776, American forces launched an invasion of Cherokee territory. The Middle towns, including Kittuwa, were burned by General Griffith Rutherford, and several of the Overhill towns were burned by John Sevier. By 1805, the Cherokee had ceded control of the Smokies to the U.S. government. Although much of the tribe was forced west along the Trail of Tears in 1838, a few—largely through the efforts of William Holland Thomas—managed to retain their land on the Qualla Boundary and today comprise the Eastern Band of Cherokee Indians.

In the 1780s, several frontier outposts had been established along the outskirts of the Smokies, namely Whitson's Fort in what is now Cosby and Wear's Fort in what is now Pigeon Forge. Permanent settlers began arriving in these areas in the 1790s. John Mingus, who built the Mingus Mill, and Ralph Hughes settled on the Oconaluftee in 1795. Other settlers soon followed and began clearing land and farming. In 1801, the Whaley brothers, William and John, moved from North Carolina to become the first settlers in what is now the Greenbrier section of the park. In 1802, Edgefield, South Carolina, resident William Ogle arrived in White Oak Flats where he cut and prepared logs for cabin construction. Although Ogle died shortly after returning to Edgefield, his wife, Martha Jane Huskey, eventually returned with her family and several other families to White Oak Flats, becoming the first permanent settlers in what would eventually become Gatlinburg. Their children and grandchildren spread out southward into the Sugarlands and Roaring Fork areas. Cades Cove was settled largely by families who had purchased lots from land speculator William "Fighting Billy" Tipton. The first of these settlers, John and Lucretia Oliver, arrived in 1818. After 1821, more families settled in Cades Cove including the Jobes, Gregorys, Sparkes, and Cables. As the community began to grow, the Cades Cove Baptist Church was established in 1827. Two Cades Cove settlers, Moses and Patience Proctor, crossed over to the North Carolina side of the Smokies in 1836 to become the first European American settlers in the Hazel Creek area. The Cataloochee area was first settled by the Caldwell family, who migrated to the valley in 1834.

Like most of southern Appalachia, the early 19th century economy of the Smokies relied on subsistence agriculture. The average farm consisted of roughly 50 acres (0.20 km^{2}), part of which was cultivated and part of which was woodland. Early settlers lived in 16 feet (4.9 m) x 20 feet (6.1 m) log cabins, although these were replaced by more elaborate log houses and eventually, as lumber became available, by modern frame houses. Most farms included at least one barn, a springhouse (used for refrigeration), a smokehouse (used for curing meat), a chicken coop (protected chickens from predators), and a corn crib (kept corn dry and protected it from rodents). Some of the more industrious farmers operated gristmills, general stores, and sorghum presses. Religion was a central theme in the lives of the early residents of the Smokies, and community life was typically centered on churches. Christian Protestantism—especially Primitive Baptists, Missionary Baptists, Methodists, and Presbyterians; dominated the religious culture of the region. Particularly because of their pressure to acquire land in the Deep South, in 1830 President Andrew Jackson signed the Indian Removal Act, beginning the process that eventually resulted in the forced removal of all Native American tribes east of the Mississippi River to Indian Territory in present-day Oklahoma. Most of the Cherokee were removed in an event that became known as the Trail of Tears. For a period some Cherokees, led by such warriors as Tsali, evaded removal by staying in the area now part of the Great Smoky Mountains National Park. A band on the Oconaluftee River acquired land and also remained. Their descendants make up most of the federally recognized Eastern Band of Cherokee Indians, based in Cherokee, North Carolina, and their Qualla Boundary reserve to the south of the park.

=== American Civil War ===
While both Tennessee and North Carolina joined the Confederacy at the outbreak of the American Civil War in 1861, Union sentiment in the Great Smoky Mountains was much stronger relative to other regions in these two states. Generally, the communities on the Tennessee side of the Smokies supported the Union, while communities on the North Carolina side supported the Confederates. On the Tennessee side, 74% of Cocke Countians, 80% of Blount Countians, and 96% of Sevier Countians voted against secession. In the North Carolina Smokies—Cherokee, Haywood, Jackson, and Macon counties—about 46% of the population favored secession. This was largely due to the fact that slavery was rare in these regions, as the geography did not allow for large plantation complexes dependent on slave labor that came to dominate the economy of the antebellum south.

While no major engagements took place in the Smokies, minor skirmishes were fairly common. Cherokee chief William Holland Thomas formed a Confederate legion made up mostly of Cherokee soldiers. Thomas' Legion crossed the Smokies in 1862 and occupied Gatlinburg for several months to protect saltpeter mines atop Mount Le Conte. Residents of predominantly Union Cades Cove and predominantly Confederate Hazel Creek routinely crossed the mountains to steal one another's livestock. Residents of Cosby and Cataloochee did likewise. One notable Civil War incident was the murder of long-time Cades Cove resident Russell Gregory (for whom Gregory Bald is named), which was carried out by bushwhackers in 1864 shortly after Gregory had led an ambush that routed a band of Confederates seeking to wreak havoc in the cove. Another incident was George Kirk's raid on Cataloochee, in which Kirk killed or wounded 15 Union soldiers recovering at a makeshift hospital.

=== Segregation in the park ===
Being located in the South, the Great Smoky Mountains National Park has a history of discrimination and segregation. In the early 20th century, most national parks were located in the west, but in the 1930s, a few national parks were founded in the south during the time of Jim Crow. During the founding of several national park in the south, including the Great Smoky Mountains National Park, local governments required the laws of the surrounding areas to be applied within the boundaries of the parks. Due to Jim Crow laws being the standard in the area during this time, they were also applied within park facilities. This meant that several parts of the park were segregated for much of the park's early history. Although African Americans played a role in the development of the national park, they often experienced discriminations, not being allowed in certain parts of the park and its surrounding cities until the 1950s.

The Great Smoky Mountains National Park was meant to be a "sanctuary for the common man," but the Jim Crow laws, which legalized racial segregation and marginalized African Americans, caused social struggles and limitations to many park visitors. Established in the American South during the 1930s, the National Park Service (NPS) adopted regional segregation practices within park boundaries to try to appease both local and state officials.

As park infrastructure continued to expand, the National Park Service developed and implemented designated segregated campgrounds and picnic areas. William J. Trent Jr., an African American official who served as the Adviser on Negro Affairs with the United States Department of the Interior, was a significant civil rights activist and key figure who challenged these policies. Trent argued that denying Black citizens equal access to national parks was a "contradiction in democratic government," as the Great Smoky Mountains National Park was federally funded and intended for public use.

- The Lewis Mountain area, located within Shenandoah National Park, was designated a "Negro Area," providing one of the only campgrounds available to African American visitors.
- Internal National Park Service memos that were written during this period revealed hesitation to approve integration. Many officials believed that social friction would deter tourists from entering the park. Due to the continued advocacy from civil rights activists and leaders, like Trent, coupled with the shifting pressures following World War II, the National Park Service saw gradual policy changes. The park became a testing ground for NPS integration. By the late 1940s and early 1950s, the park began to officially desegregate its facilities.

=== Logging and early preservation movements ===
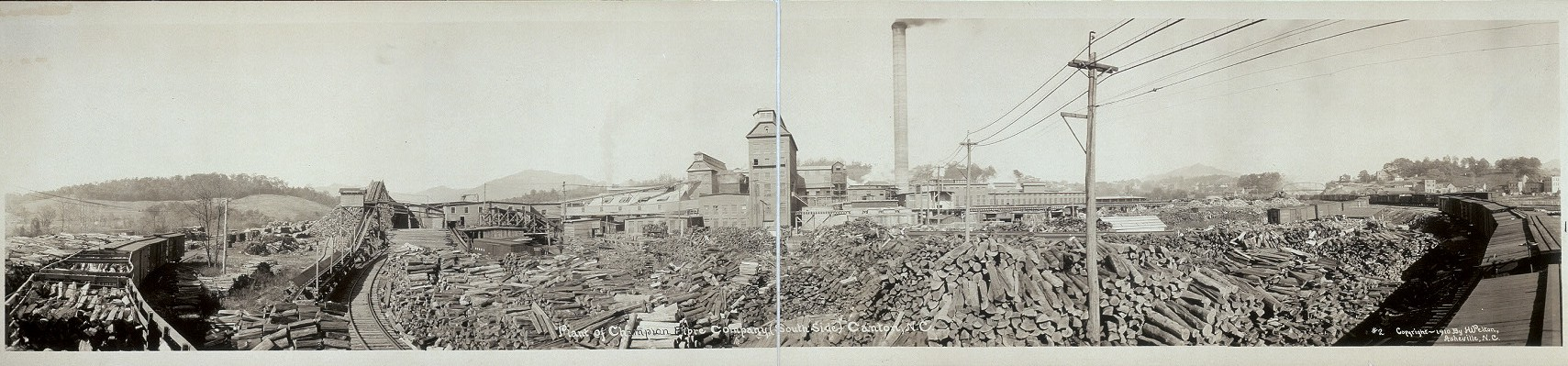
The Champion Fibre Company plant in Canton, North Carolina, 1910

While selective logging occurred in the Great Smoky Mountains throughout the 19th century, the general inaccessibility of the forests prevented major logging operations, and lumber firms initially relied on the lowland forests in the northeastern United States and the Mississippi Delta in the southeast. As timber resources in these regions became exhausted, and as the demand for lumber skyrocketed after the Civil War, entrepreneurs began looking for ways to reach the virgin forests of southern Appalachia. The first logging operations in the Smokies, which began in the 1880s, used splash dams or booms to float logs down rivers to lumber mills in nearby cities. Notable splash dam and boom operations included the English Lumber Company on Little River, the Taylor and Crate operations along Hazel Creek, and the ambitious operations of Alexander Arthur on the Pigeon River. All three of these operations failed within their first few years, however, after their dams and boom systems were destroyed by floods.

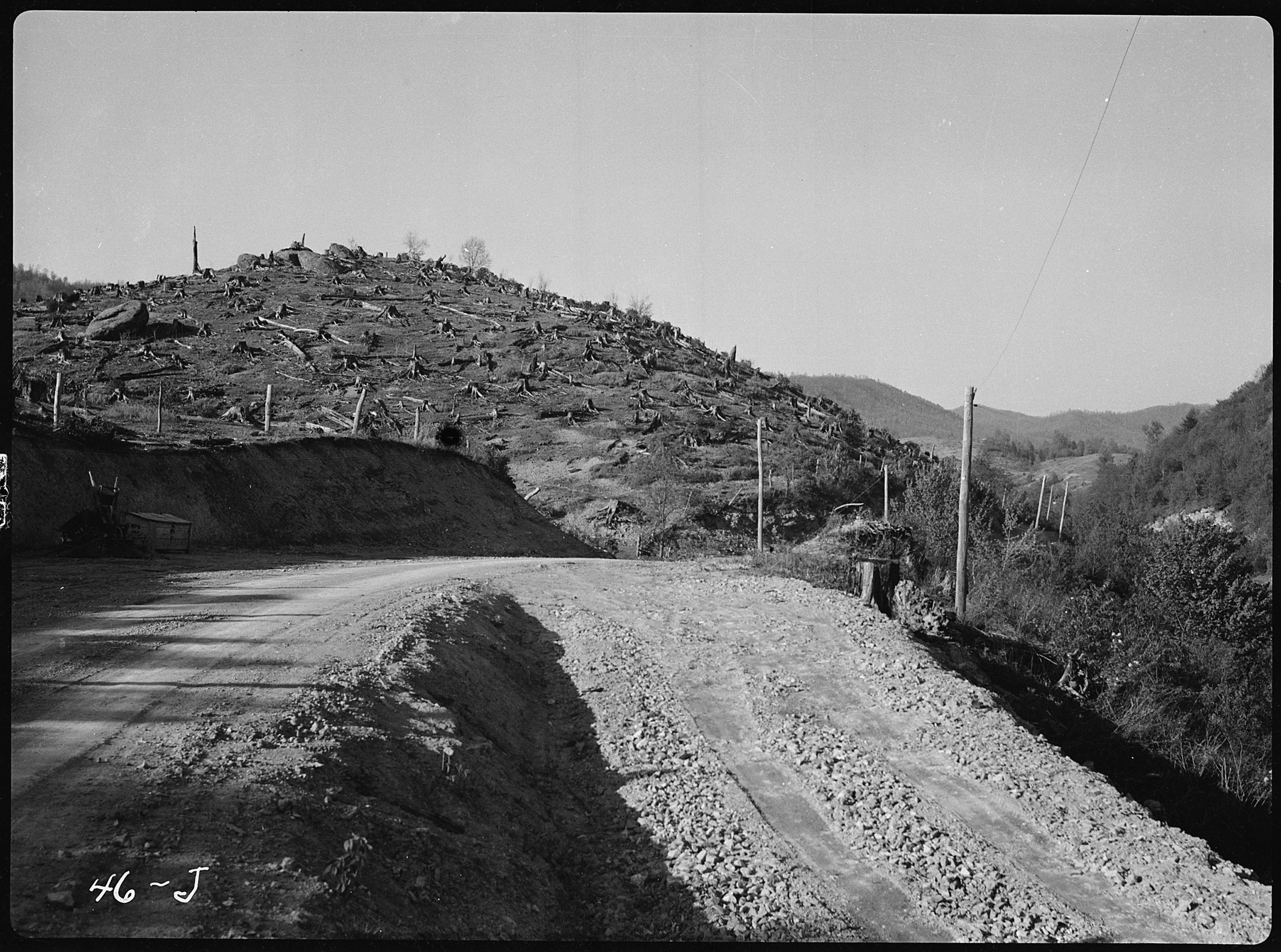
Clearcut logging in the Blue Ridge Mountains in Tennessee in 1936

Innovations in logging railroads and band saw technology in the late 19th century made large-scale logging possible in the mountainous areas of southern Appalachia. The largest logging operation in the Smokies was the Little River Lumber Company, which logged the Little River watershed between 1901 and 1939. The firm constructed the Little River Railroad to haul timber out of the remote regions of the area, and established company towns at Townsend (named for the company's chief owner and manager, Col. Wilson B. Townsend), Elkmont, and Tremont. The Little River Railroad set an example for larger companies to also purchase land in the Smokies for logging. The second-largest logging operation was the Ritter Lumber Company, which logged the Hazel Creek watershed between 1907 and 1928. Ruins of Ritter's lumbering operations are still visible along the Hazel Creek Trail. Other lumbering operations included Three M Lumber and Champion Fibre, both of which logged the Oconaluftee watershed. Logging in the Smokies reached its peak in 1909, and by the time all operations ceased in the 1930s, logging firms had removed two-thirds of the virgin forests from the Smokies. According to the National Park Service, 80% of the Smokies was clear cut in the early 20th century.

=== Early tourism and park establishment ===
The idea for a national park in the southern Appalachians first reportedly arose in the late 19th century. In the early 20th century, locals began banding together to raise money for the preservation of the land, as its natural beauty was being destroyed by the cut-and-run-style clearcutting employed by the timber companies. Wilson B. Townsend, the head of Little River Lumber, began advertising Elkmont as a tourist destination in 1909. Within a few years, the Wonderland Hotel and the Appalachian Club had been established to cater to elite Knoxvillians seeking summer mountain getaways. When the National Park Service was established in 1916, they wanted a park in the eastern United States but did not have the funds to establish one at the time.

In the summer of 1923, Knoxville resident Anne May Davis envisioned a national park in the Great Smoky Mountains while visiting Yellowstone National Park. Davis shared her idea with her husband, Knoxville businessman W. P. Davis, who shared the idea with then-Secretary of Interior Hubert Work. Davis initially encountered difficulty in gaining support for the movement, but by the end of the year, worked with several Appalachian Club members, among them Knoxville businessman Colonel David C. Chapman; and the Knoxville Automobile Club to found the Great Smoky Mountains Conservation Association (GSMCA). In 1924, Secretary Work established the Southern Appalachian National Park Committee to study the feasibility of a national park in the southern Appalachians. On July 30, 1924, a delegation from the GSMCA met with the Park Committee in Asheville, and presented a series of photographs of the park to the committee. This convinced members of the committee, many of whom favored a national park in the Grandfather Mountain–Linville Gorge area, to visit the Smokies and begin pursuing the range as a candidate for a national park. Knoxville Mayor Ben Morton, travel writer Horace Kephart, explorer Paul M. Fink, and photographers Jim Thompson and George Masa were also instrumental in fostering the development of the park. The movement was backed by automobile clubs, most of which were chapters of the American Automobile Association. In addition to preservation, supporters of the park also stressed the economic benefit of tourism.

On December 13, 1924, the Park Committee recommended the establishment of national parks in the Smokies and the Blue Ridge Mountains in Virginia, the latter of which would become Shenandoah National Park. In 1925, Tennessee Governor Austin Peay signed legislation authorizing the first land purchase for the park, and appointed Colonel Chapman chairman of the Tennessee State Park and Forestry Commission. He was largely responsible for raising funds for land purchases and coordinating park efforts between local, state, and federal entities. That same year, a lodge was established atop Mount Le Conte by hiker Paul Adams to entertain visiting dignitaries from Washington, D.C. President Calvin Coolidge signed legislation on May 22, 1926, which authorized the park, but there was no nucleus of federally owned land around which to develop it. In 1927, both states' legislatures established commissions to orchestrate land purchases and agreed to provide the first appropriations for these purchases, contingent on the remaining funds being raised from other sources. North Carolina provided $2 million (equivalent to $29 million in 2024) from the state's general fund, and Tennessee provided $1.5 million (equivalent to $21.7 million in 2024) which was funded by a special gasoline tax. Private citizens raised approximately $1 million (equivalent to $14.4 million in 2024), but struggled to raise the necessary funds until businessman and philanthropist John D. Rockefeller Jr. contributed $5 million (equivalent to $71.9 million in 2024) to the effort in March 1928.

The creation of the Great Smoky Mountains National Park proved much more complex than its predecessors in the west, which were largely concocted from federally owned land. Along with convincing logging firms to sell lucrative lumber rights, the park commissions had to negotiate the purchase of thousands of small farms and remove entire communities. Slowly, mountain homesteaders, miners, and loggers were evicted from their land. Farms and timbering operations were abolished to establish the protected areas of the park. Ben W. Hooper, who had served as Governor of Tennessee from 1911 to 1915, served as the principal land purchasing agent for the park. The park commissioners also had to deal with the Tennessee and North Carolina legislatures, which at times were opposed to spending taxpayer money on park efforts. In spite of these difficulties, the park commission had completed most major land purchases by 1932. During the Great Depression, the Civilian Conservation Corps, the Works Progress Administration, and other federal organizations hired workers to build trails, firetowers, roads, and other infrastructure in the park. The Great Smoky Mountains National Park was officially established by Congress on June 15, 1934. On September 2, 1940, President Franklin D. Roosevelt formally dedicated the park in a ceremony at the Rockefeller Memorial at Newfound Gap to a crowd of approximately 10,000 people.

=== Later park history ===
The park saw a massive increase in visitors as part of a tourism boom during the Post–World War II economic expansion. The federal government first began a program to improve roads within, and leading to, the park, at the end of the war. Later, a number of new facilities were constructed to handle the influx in visitors as part of Mission 66, a nationwide effort to improve park services by the NPS' 50th anniversary in 1966. These included a new observation tower on Kuwohi and the Sugarlands Visitor Center. A number of tourist attractions began to develop in Gatlinburg, Cherokee, and other nearby towns in the mid 20th century to cater to park visitors. The celebrity status of country music singer and actress Dolly Parton, who grew up in nearby Pittman Center, Tennessee, brought further attention to the park in the latter 20th and 21st centuries. In 1986, Parton cofounded the theme park Dollywood in Pigeon Forge with Herschend Family Entertainment. Dollywood resulted in a further tourist attraction boom in Gatlinburg, Pigeon Forge, and Sevierville that continues to the present day. These attractions, combined with the increasing adoption of the automobile, have brought additional visitors to the national park. This increase in tourism has greatly strained the infrastructure of the park and surrounding areas, necessitating additional road and transportation improvements.

The Great Smoky Mountains National Park was designated an International Biosphere Reserve in 1976, was certified as a UNESCO World Heritage Site in 1983, and became a part of the Southern Appalachian Biosphere Reserve in 1988. A 75th anniversary re-dedication ceremony was held on September 2, 2009. Among those in attendance were the four U.S. senators from Tennessee and North Carolina, the three U.S. Representatives whose districts include the park, the governors of both states, and Secretary of the Interior Ken Salazar. Dolly Parton also attended and performed. In 2015, Cassius Cash became the first African American superintendent of the Great Smoky Mountains National Park. He is also the 16th superintendent of the park. In late November and early December 2016, a series of wildfires engulfed a total of 17,900 acres (72 km^{2}) in the park and surrounding areas. The wildfires killed at least 14, injured 190, and forced the evacuation of more than 14,000 people. The fires also damaged or destroyed at least 2,000 structures. The fires, which were initially suspected to have been caused by arson, occurred during a period of unusual drought, which accelerated the fires. The wildfires were the deadliest in the Eastern United States since the Great Fires of 1947 and comprised one of the worst natural disasters in the history of Tennessee. In 2023, the national park was featured on a USPS Priority Mail Express stamp depicting a scene near Newfound Gap. The stamp was designed by USPS art director Greg Breeding, with art from Dan Cosgrove.

== See also ==
- Great Smoky Mountains Association
- Great Smoky Mountains Heritage Center
- Wildflowers of the Great Smoky Mountains
- List of birds of Great Smoky Mountains National Park
- List of national parks of the United States
