= John Ownby Cabin =

Historic house in Tennessee, United States

- U.S. National Register of Historic Places
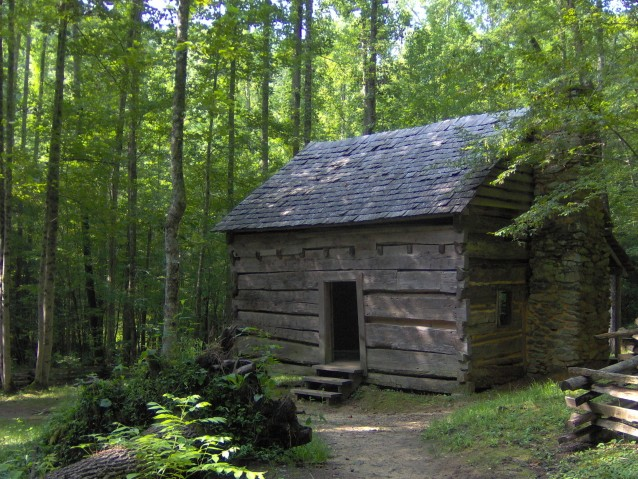
- Front of the cabin

- Location within Tennessee Location within the United States
- Location: 3 miles south of Gatlinburg off State Route 73 in Great Smoky Mountains National Park
- Nearest city: Gatlinburg, Tennessee
- Coordinates: 35°41′22″N 83°32′50″W
- Area: less than one acre
- Built: 1860
- NRHP reference No.: 76000167
- Added to NRHP: January 1, 1976

The John Ownby Cabin is a historic cabin in Sevier County, Tennessee, United States. Located in The Sugarlands, it lies within the boundaries of the Great Smoky Mountains National Park. It was built in 1860, and is the last surviving structure from the pre-park Forks-of-the-River community. Repairs were carried out on the dilapidated cabin in 1964, which included replacing the front porch, and the cabin was added to the National Register of Historic Places in 1976. The cabin currently stands along the Fighting Creek Nature Trail, an interpretive trail accessible behind the Sugarlands Visitor Center.

The cabin is a one-story, single-pen cabin measuring 20 feet (6.1 m) by 18 feet (5.5 m). The walls are built of hewn white pine and poplar logs with dove-tail notching. The cabin's interior contains a sawn board floor, and lacks a loft. The 4-foot (1.2 m) porch consists of sawn boards over a hewn log sill. The cabin's gabled roof is covered with split oak shingles, and the roof of the porch, which is slightly lower than the cabin roof, is supported by hardwood posts. The cabin has two board and batten doors and two windows, and a chimney constructed of rubble and red clay.
