= Tulip Grove =

- U.S. National Register of Historic Places
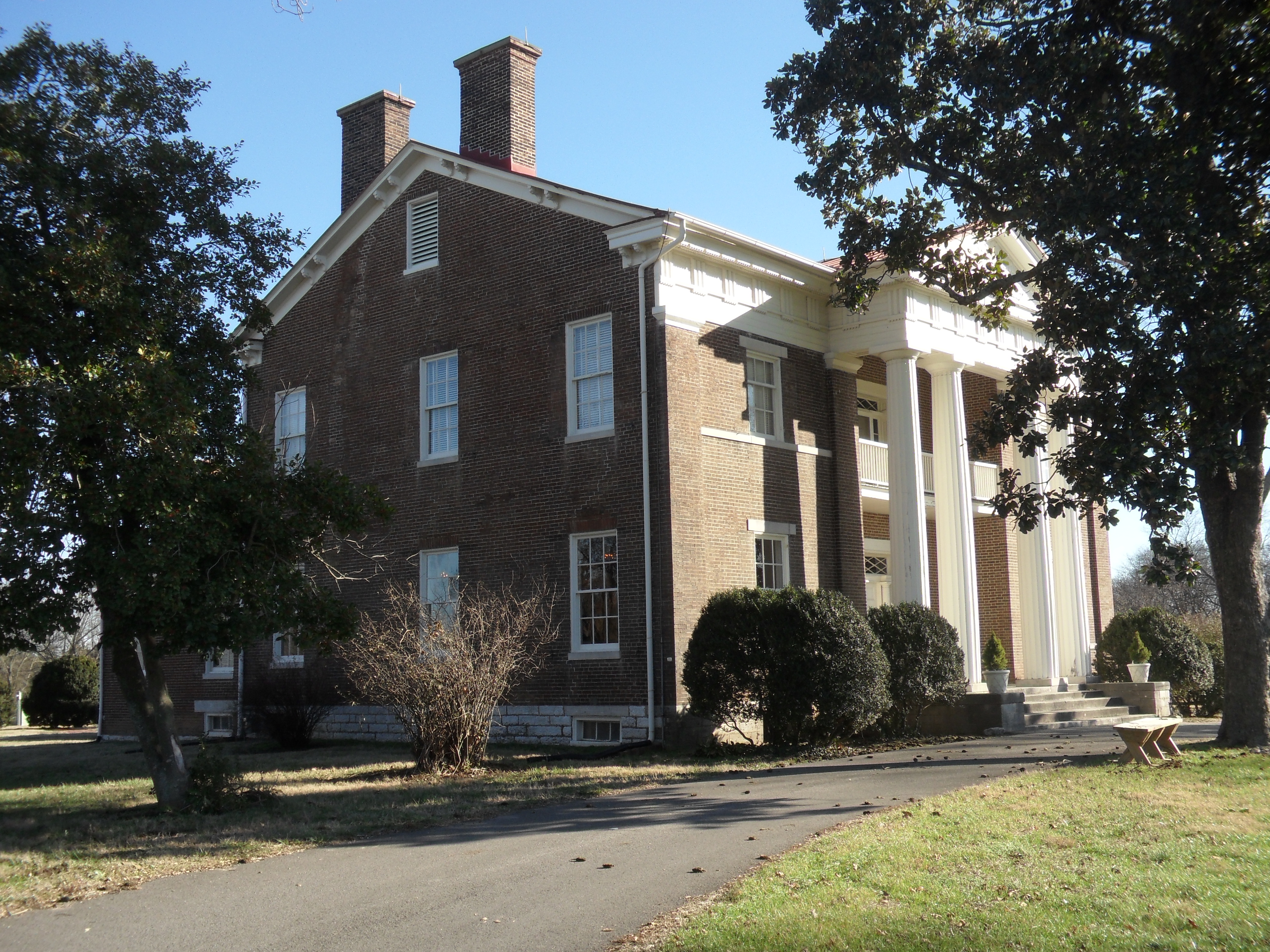

- Location within Tennessee
- Location: Lebanon Rd, Hermitage, Tennessee
- Coordinates: 36°12′44.43″N 86°36′11.33″W
- Area: 10 acres (4.0 ha)
- Built: 1836
- Architect: William C. Hume, Joseph Rieff
- Architectural style: Greek Revival
- NRHP reference No.: 70000607
- Added to NRHP: February 26, 1970

Tulip Grove is an antebellum house built in 1836 for Andrew Jackson Donelson, who was the nephew of Andrew Jackson. The site was listed on the National Register of Historic Places in 1970.

== History ==
While Andrew Jackson was still president in 1834, Andrew Jackson Donelson decided to build Tulip Grove on land near the Hermitage. He enlisted Nashville master builders William C. Hume and Joseph Reiff, who were working on rebuilding the Hermitage mansion after a fire, to undertake the construction.

The house was completed in 1836 with the original name of "Poplar Grove." Former president Martin Van Buren allegedly suggested Donelson rename it Tulip Grove during a visit in 1842.

In April 1858, Donelson sold the property to wool producer Mark R. Cockrill. Other owners included Thomas O. Treanor and Mary Andrews Treanor, whose daughter, the painter Mayna Treanor Avent (1868–1959), was born there.

== Lawsuit ==
In 1914, Charles Buntin and Jane Berry Buntin purchased the home and surrounding property. On March 11, 1964, Jane Buntin deeded the mansion and 26.33 acres surrounding it to the Ladies' Hermitage Association (LHA), now known as the Andrew Jackson Foundation. In return, the LHA agreed to pay Buntin, "her heirs and assigns, for a period of ninety-nine (99) years from and after March 1, 1964 one-third (1/3) of all gate receipts received by Grantee from visitors to Tulip Grove House located on said land, which payments are to be made on a monthly basis."

From 1965 to 2001, the LHA paid the Buntin family over $300,000 from ticket sales. In 2001, the LHA discontinued the tours, citing their lack of profitability, and began using Tulip Grove as an event space. This change resulted in the Buntin family receiving a $1,200 annual payment instead of a portion of ticket sales. In 2007, members of the Buntin family filed suit against the LHA for breach of contract.

In 2012, the Tennessee Court of Appeals upheld a lower court ruling that the LHA had not breached the contract, but it also ruled that the Buntin family was due a portion of revenue generated by special events held at Tulip Grove.

== Architecture ==
Tulip Grove is representative of the antebellum Greek Revival style that was popular before the American Civil War. It consists of two main stories, a basement, and an attic.

== Tulip Grove Gallery ==
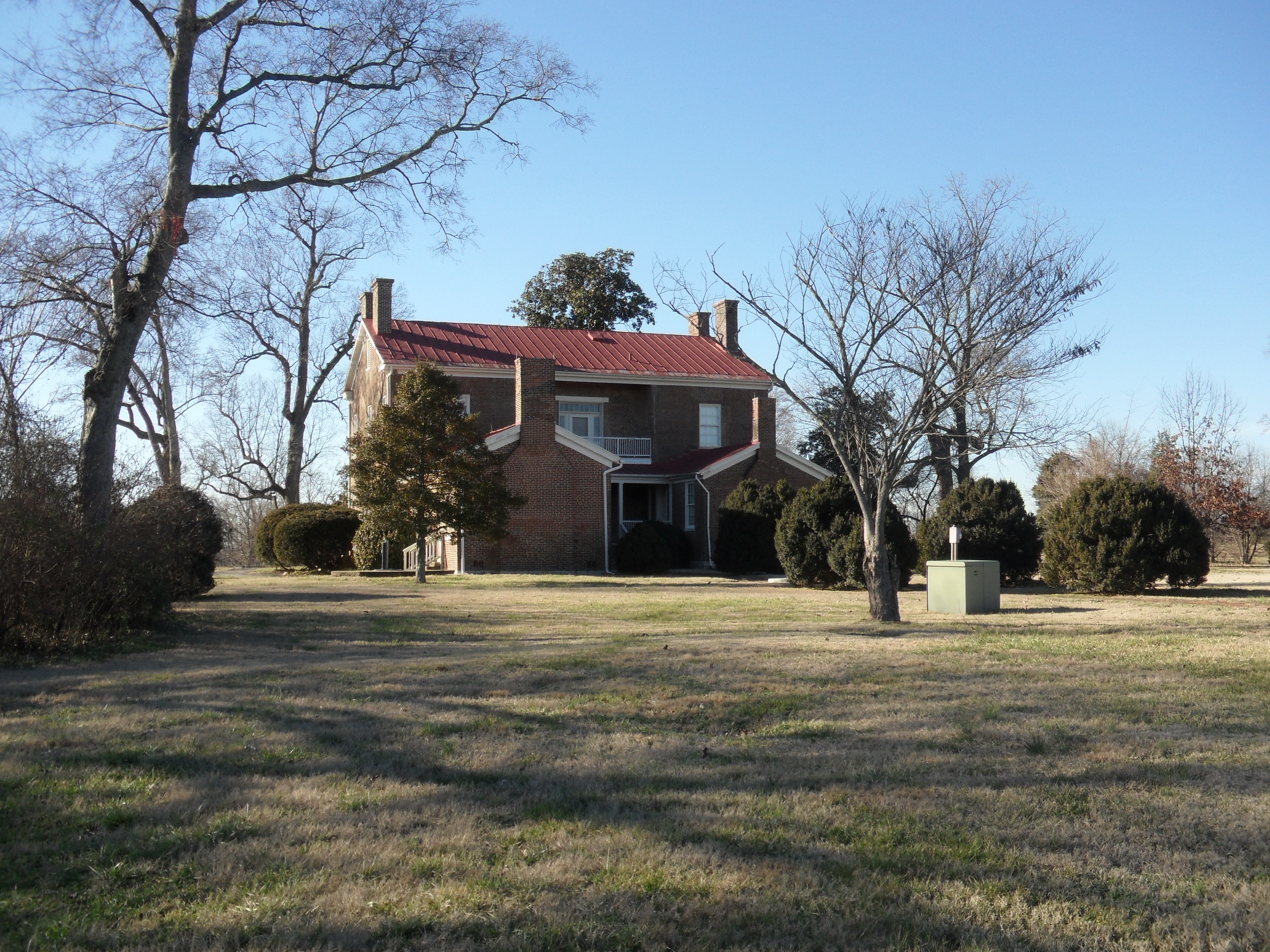
Exterior rear view

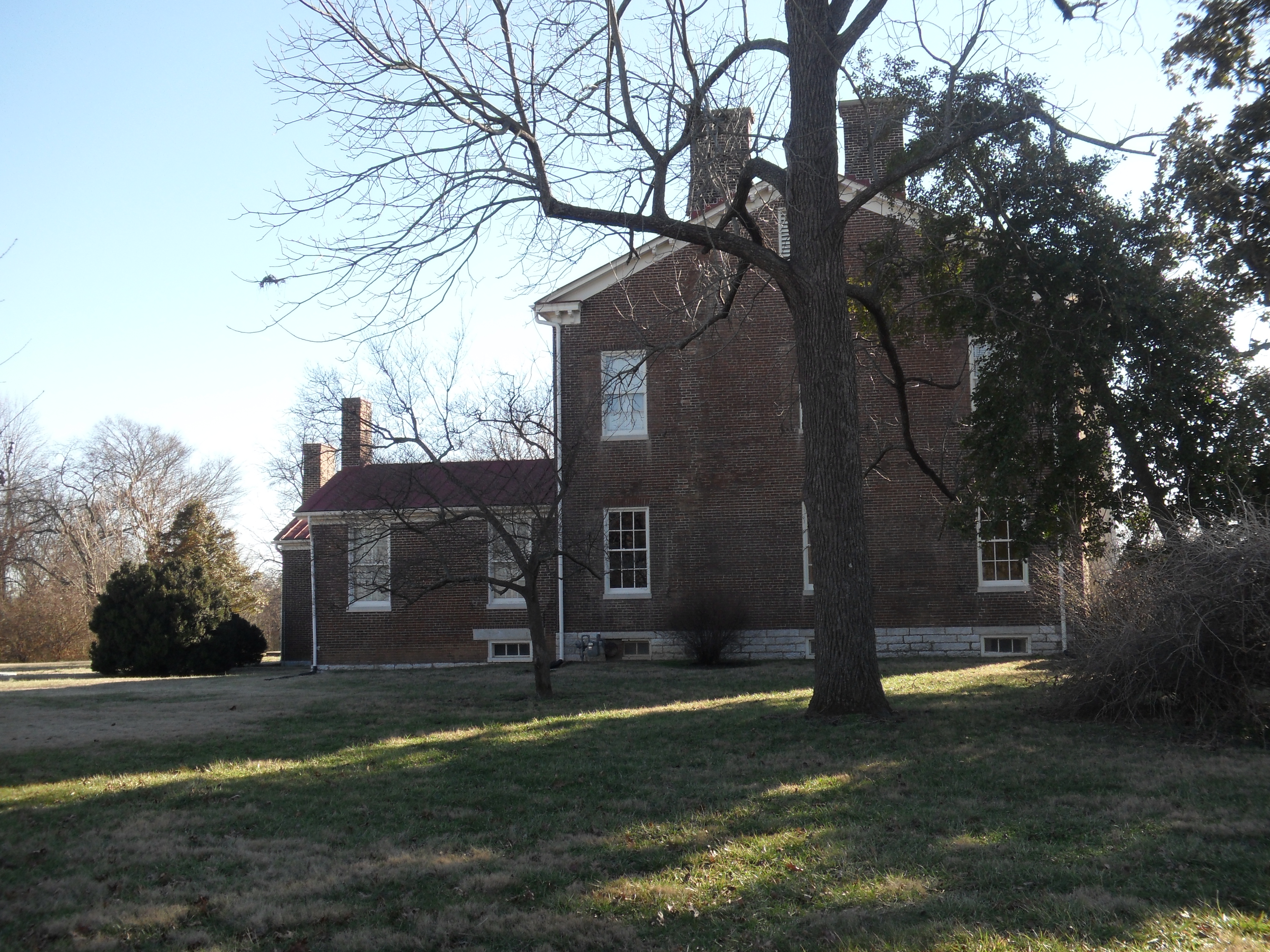
Exterior side view

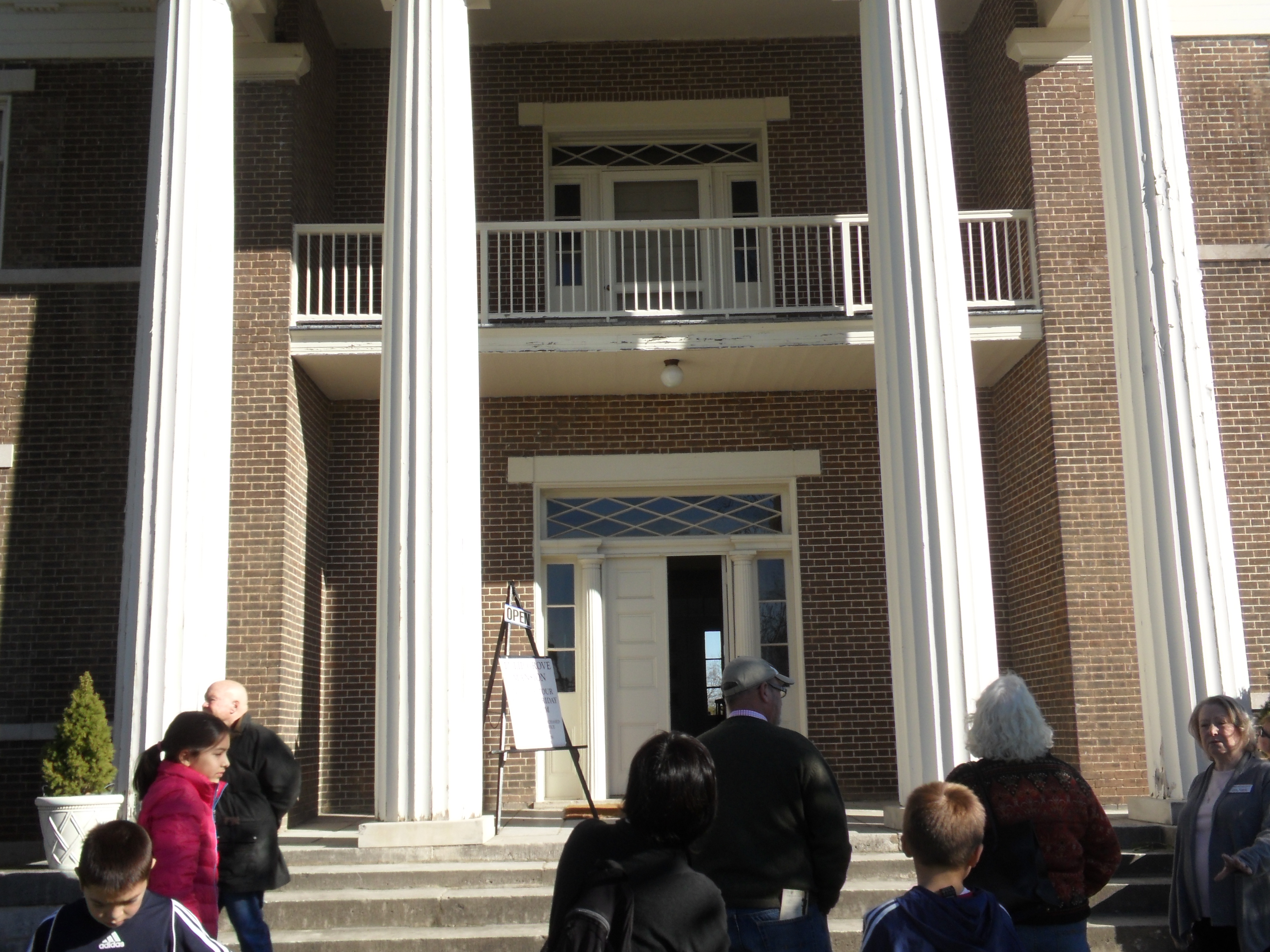
Front closeup

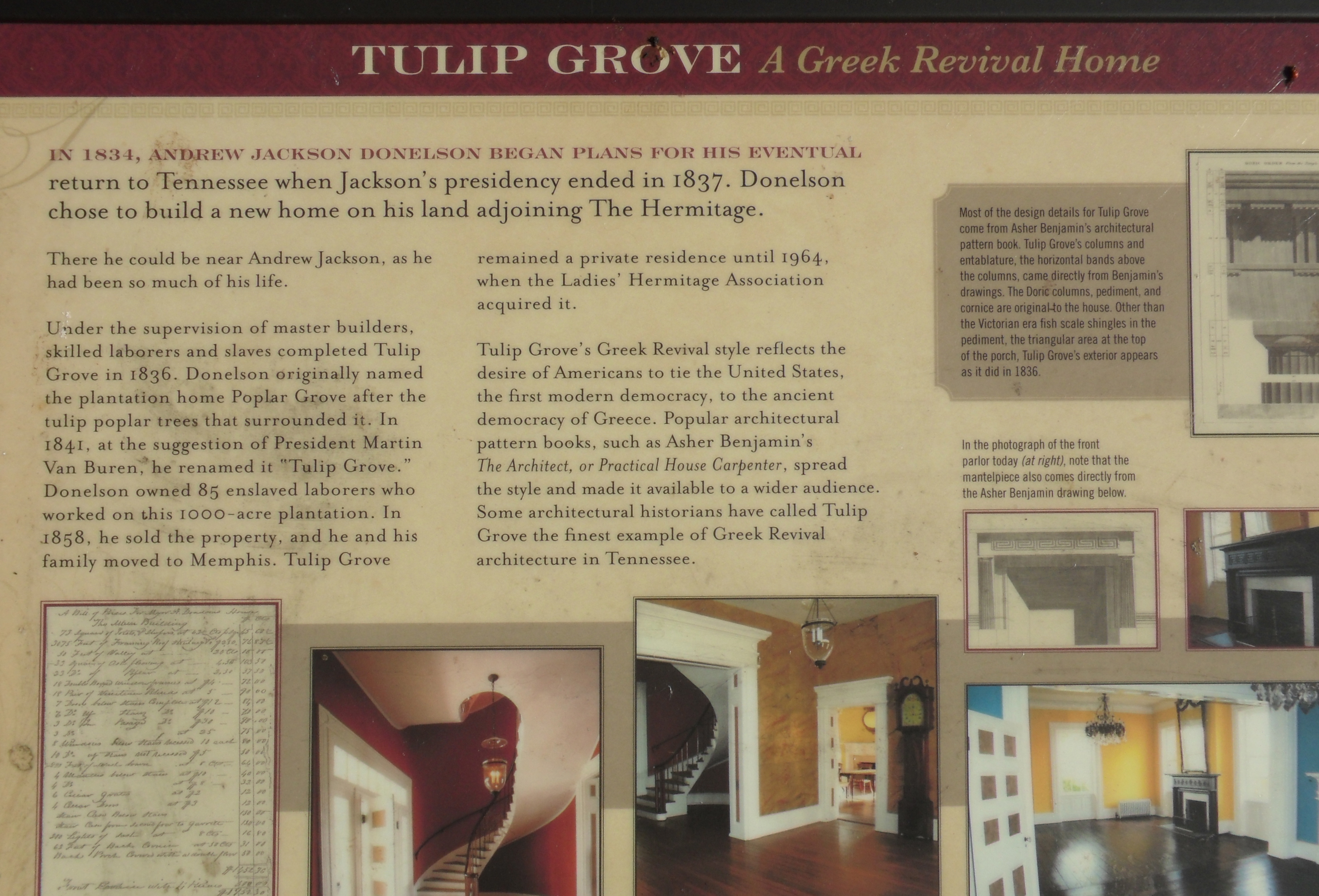
Exterior Descriptive Signboard

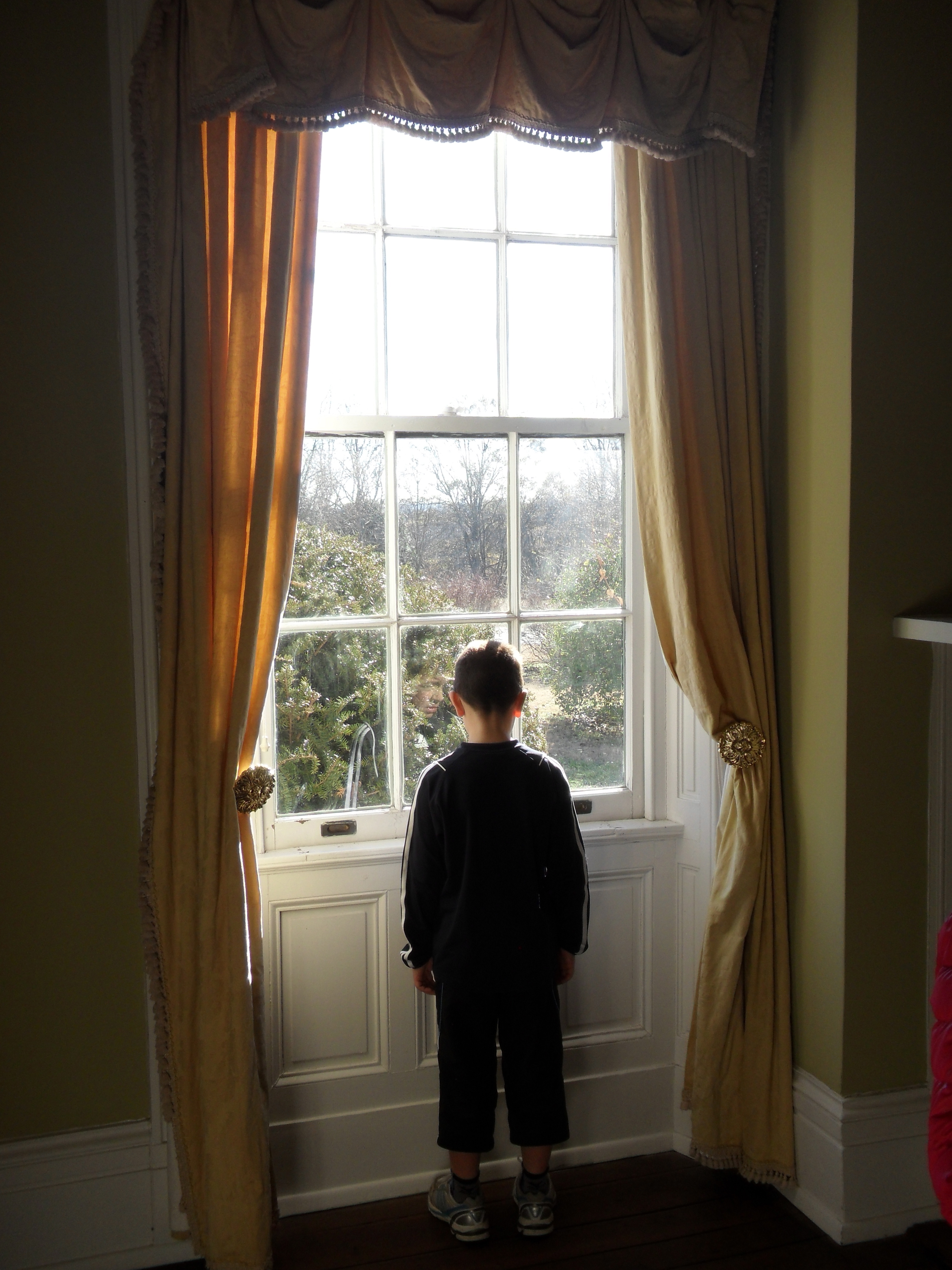
Interior dining room window

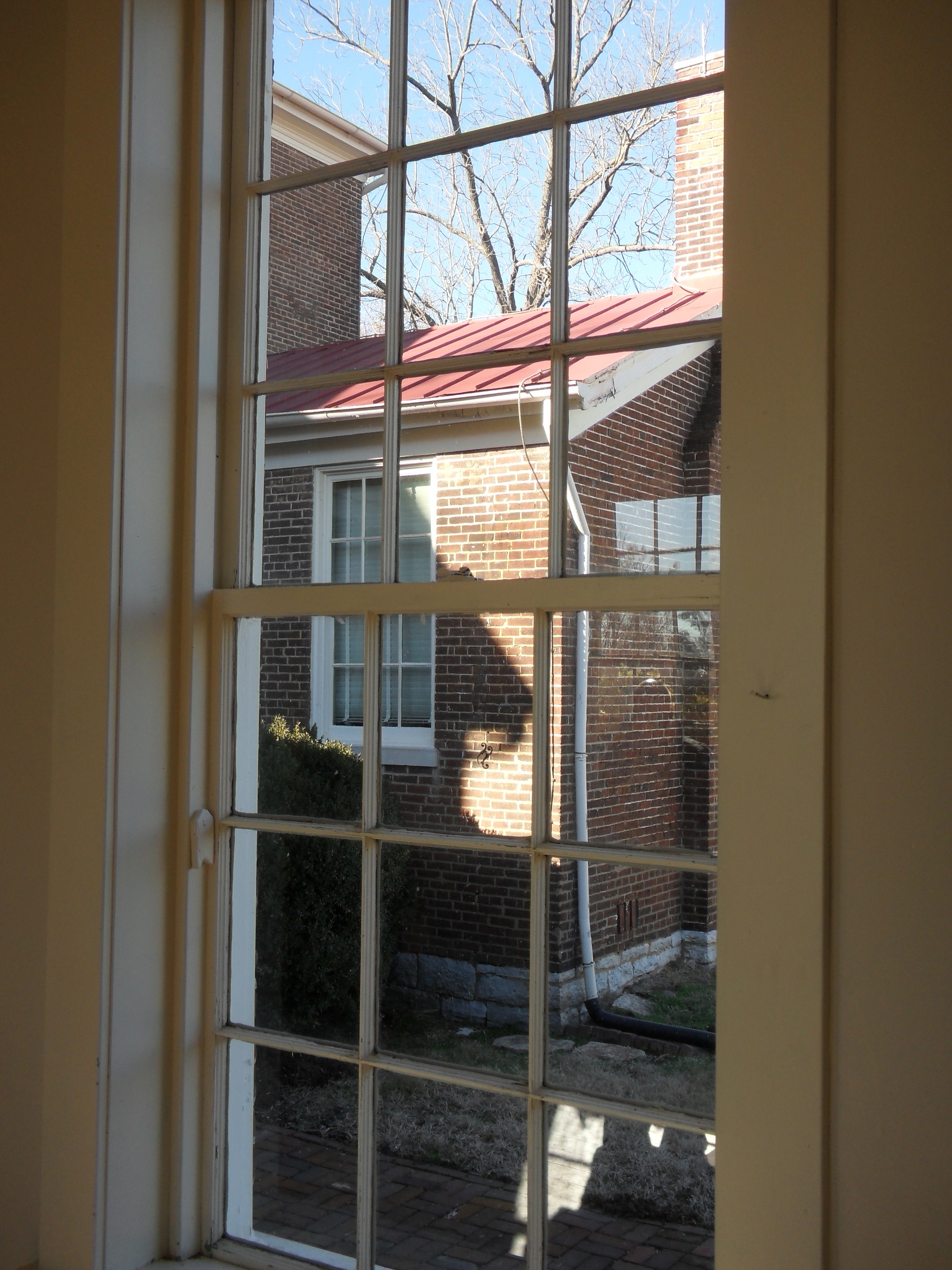
Interior view of plantation office through window

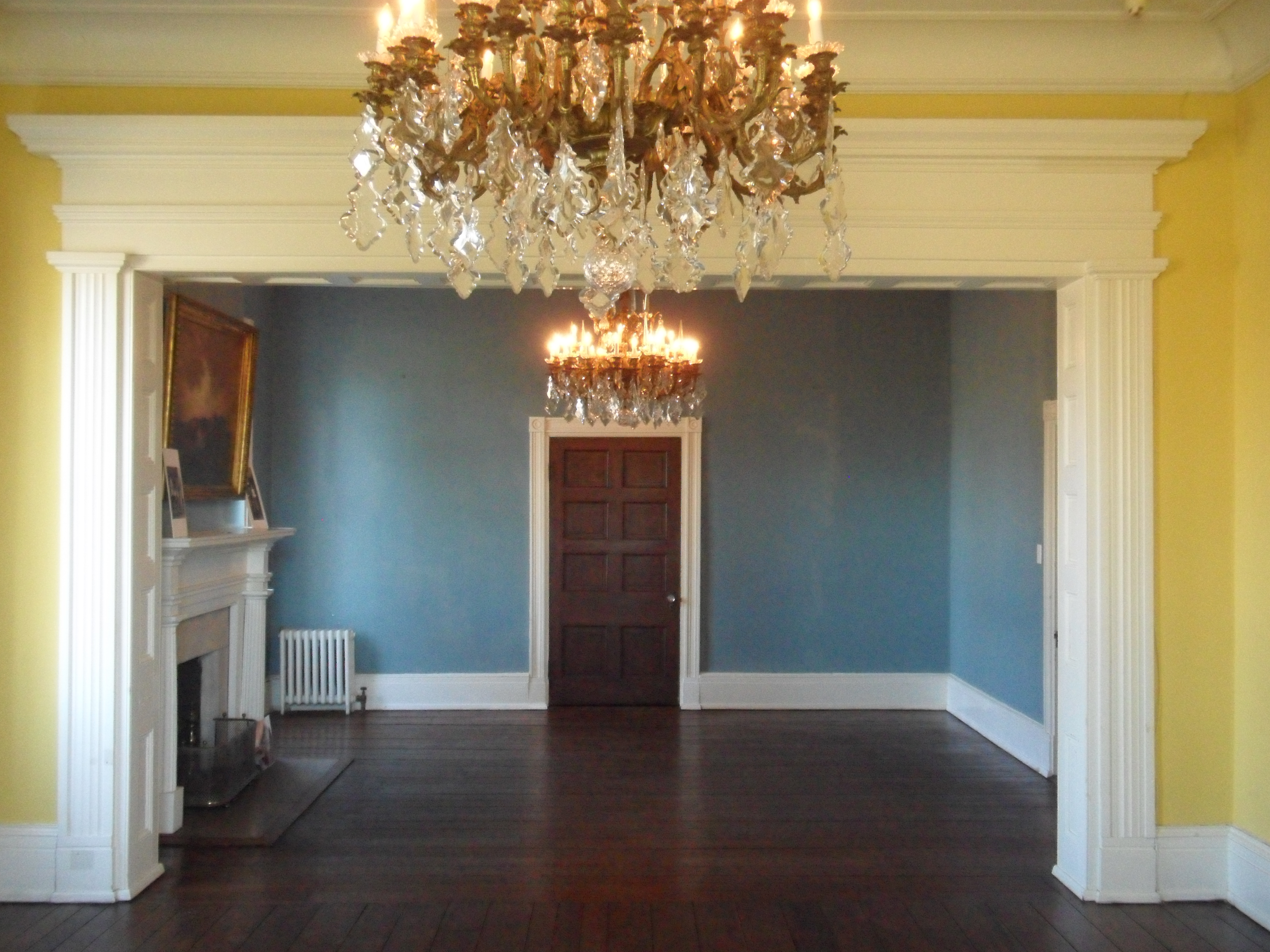
Parlor

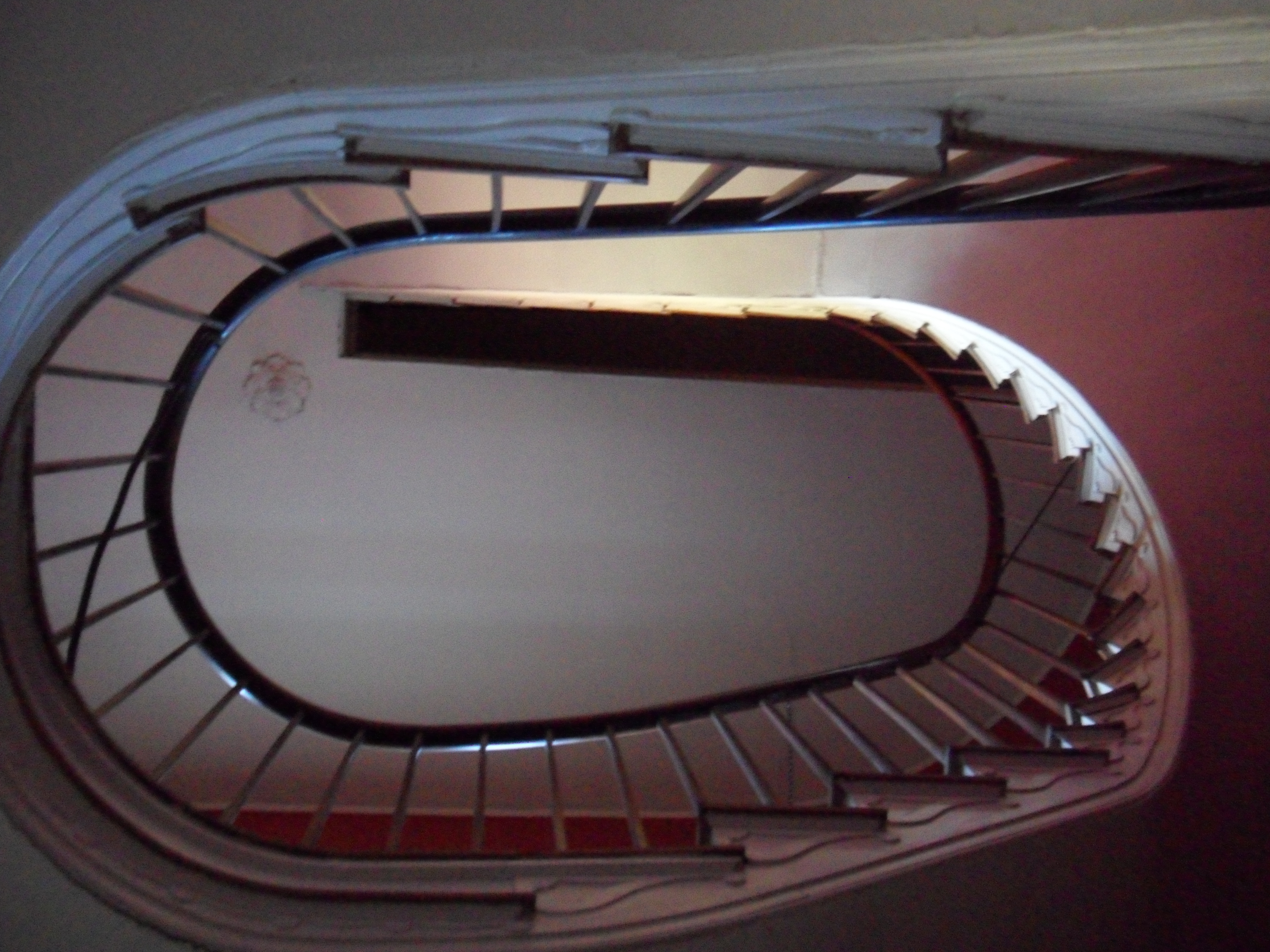
Interior stairwell

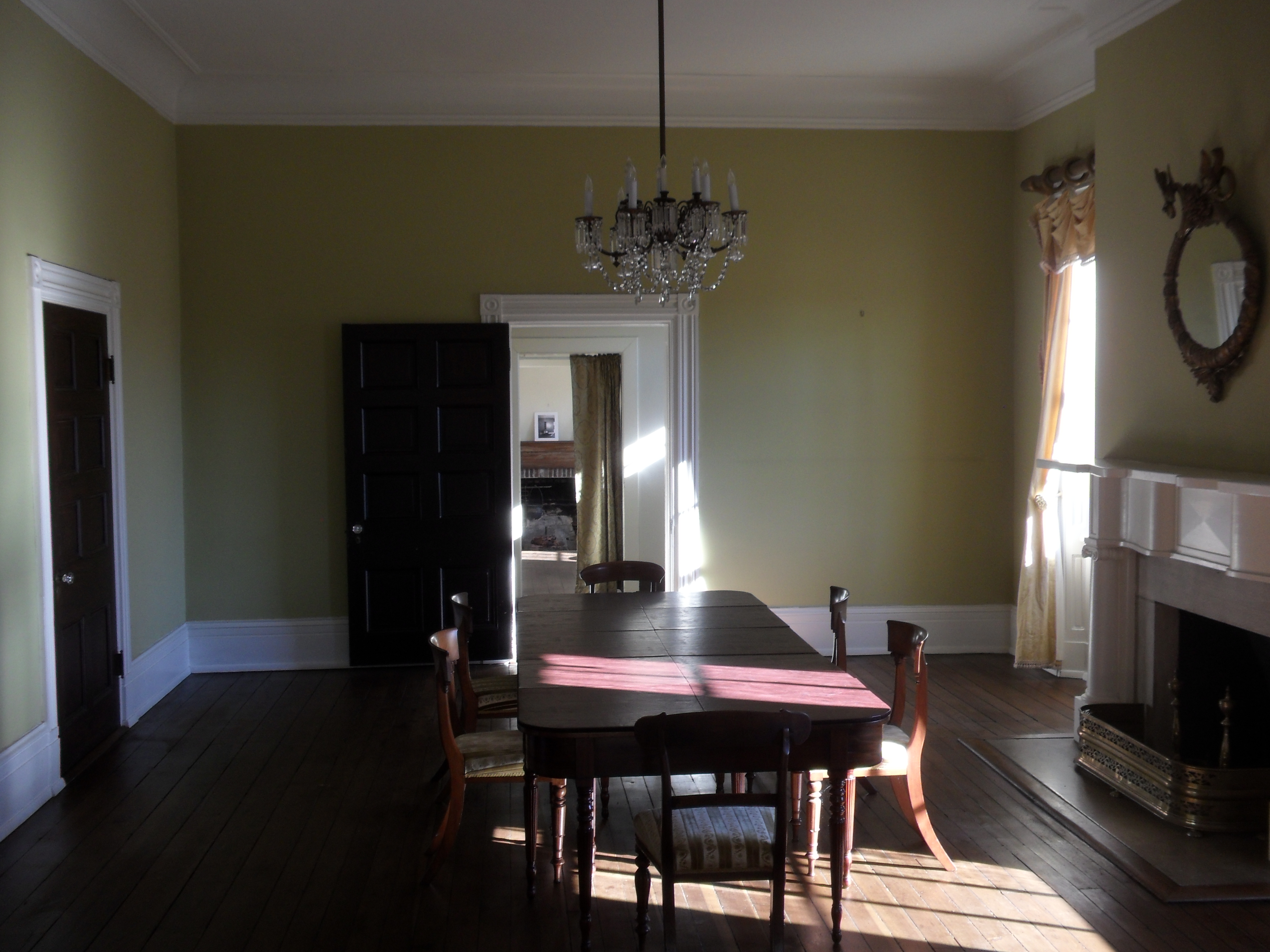
Kitchen view from dining room

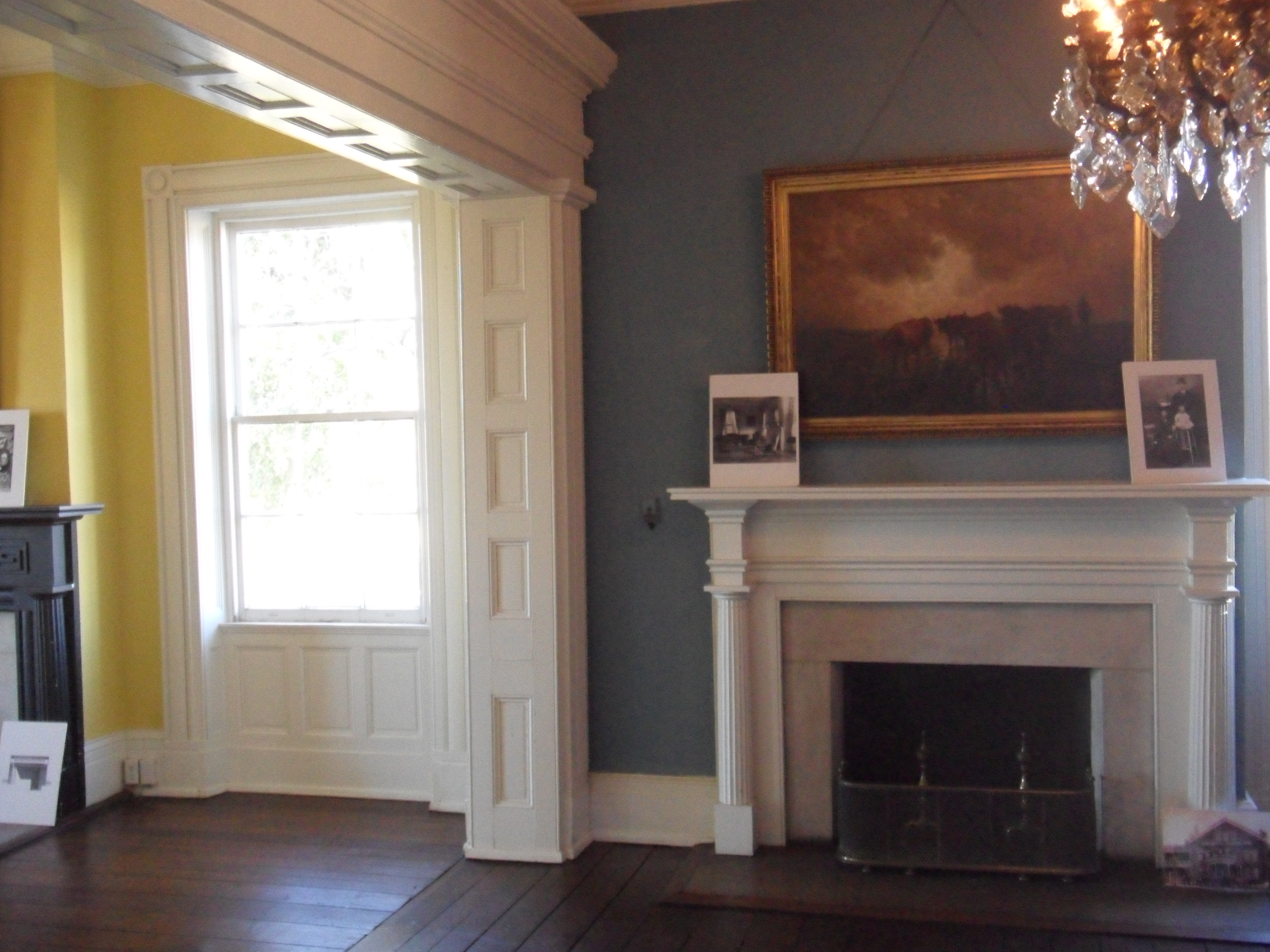
Parlor fireplace

Artist Mayna Treanor Avent at Tulip Grove c1930
