= Mayna Treanor Avent Studio =

Historic house in Tennessee, United States

- U.S. National Register of Historic Places
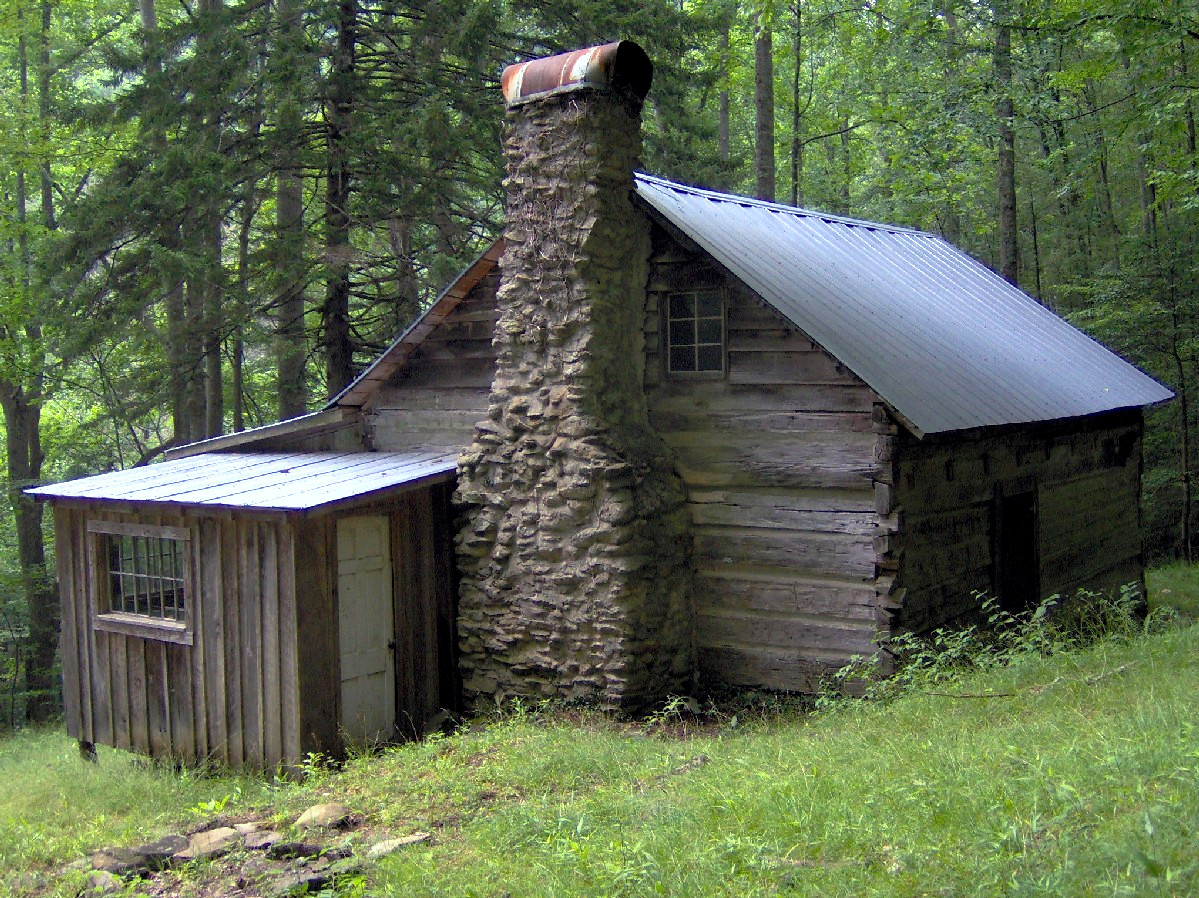
- The Avent Cabin, near Elkmont
- Location: Jake's Creek Trail, 1 mile (1.6 km) south of Elkmont
- Nearest city: Elkmont, Tennessee
- Coordinates: 35°38′16.68″N 83°35′9.86″W
- Built: 1850
- NRHP reference No.: 93001575
- Added to NRHP: February 7, 1994

Avent Cabin, in the Great Smoky Mountains National Park near Elkmont, Tennessee, United States, is an early Appalachian mountain cabin that was used as a summer studio and retreat by noted artist Mayna Treanor Avent (1865–1959). It is listed on the National Register of Historic Places.

== History and description ==
Built around 1850 by the Ownby Family, it was constructed as a one-room cabin from poplar logs. The building has a gable roof, an exterior cobblestone and concrete chimney and a stone foundation. The main cabin is rectangular 16 feet (4.9 m) by 23.5 feet (7.2 m). The logs are half dovetail notched with both mud and concrete chinking. Originally, there was only a single window and door in the cabin and no stone fireplace. Two of the entrance doors are vertical board design and date to about 1910. On the rear or east is a shed roof wing with vertical board siding that contains a kitchen and an enclosed porch.

It was purchased in 1918 by Frank Avent, husband of Mayna Avent, for $200 from the Ownby family and remodeled into its present appearance in 1926. Ownership of the cabin and its 18.5 acres (7.5 hectares) of land was transferred to the National Park Service in 1932. A lease was given to the son of Frank and Mayna Avent, James Avent and his wife Jeannette and remained with the Avent family until its expiration in 1992. Significant alternations were made in 1972, some of which were removed in 1992-1993 when the Avent lease expired to restore it to be closer to its appearance when it was used as a studio.

It is the only authentic Appalachian Settler cabin that remains along Jake's Creek in its original location.

== Use as the Avent Studio ==
Mayna Avent began using the cabin as a studio in 1919 and continued to do so for over 20 years. Several alterations to the structure were made to make it more conducive for studio use. For example, to improve illumination, two large openings were created: a window at the southwest elevation, and at the southeast wall, a pane glassed door providing access to the porch. A stone fireplace and stone chimney were constructed at the northeast wall.

== Location ==
The cabin is located approximately 1 mile (1.6 km) south of Elkmont, Tennessee on the west side of Jake's Creek Valley. It is accessible on the Jake's Creek Trail which passes approximately 200 yards (180 m) to the east of the cabin. A footpath winds down to Jake's Creek crossing over traces of the old Elkmont Road, crosses over the Creek by a foot-log bridge, and up the ridge where the cabin is located on a steep bluff.

At an altitude of 2,700 feet (820 m), the cabin lies on a steep side of a ridge overlooking Jake's Creek Valley. Small areas of the forest were cleared by the Ownby family for apple orchards, potato and corn fields and for bee-keeping. Stone retaining walls, some of which can still be seen, were constructed to support the leveling of the topology for agricultural use.

== Gallery ==
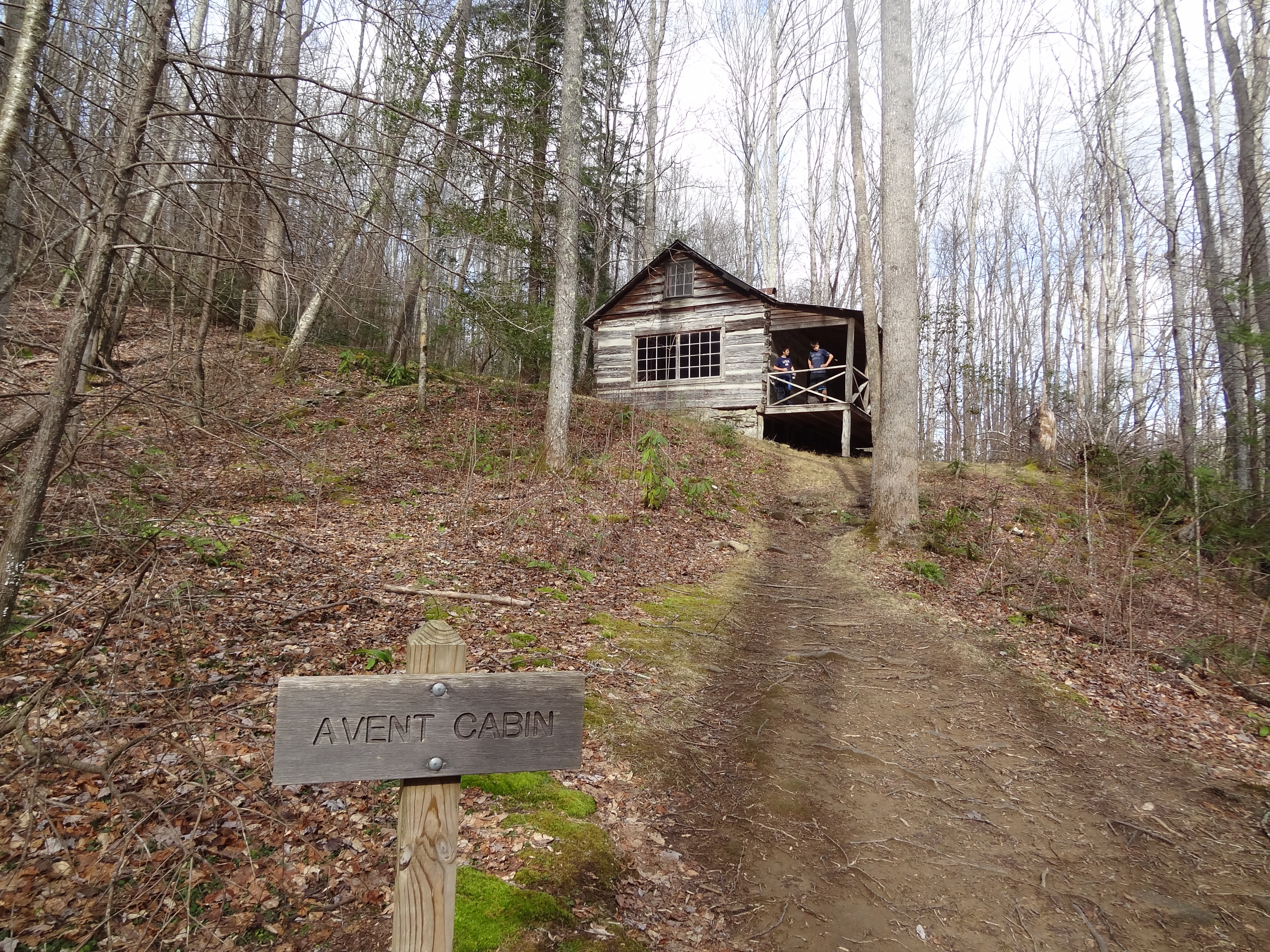
Sign below Cabin

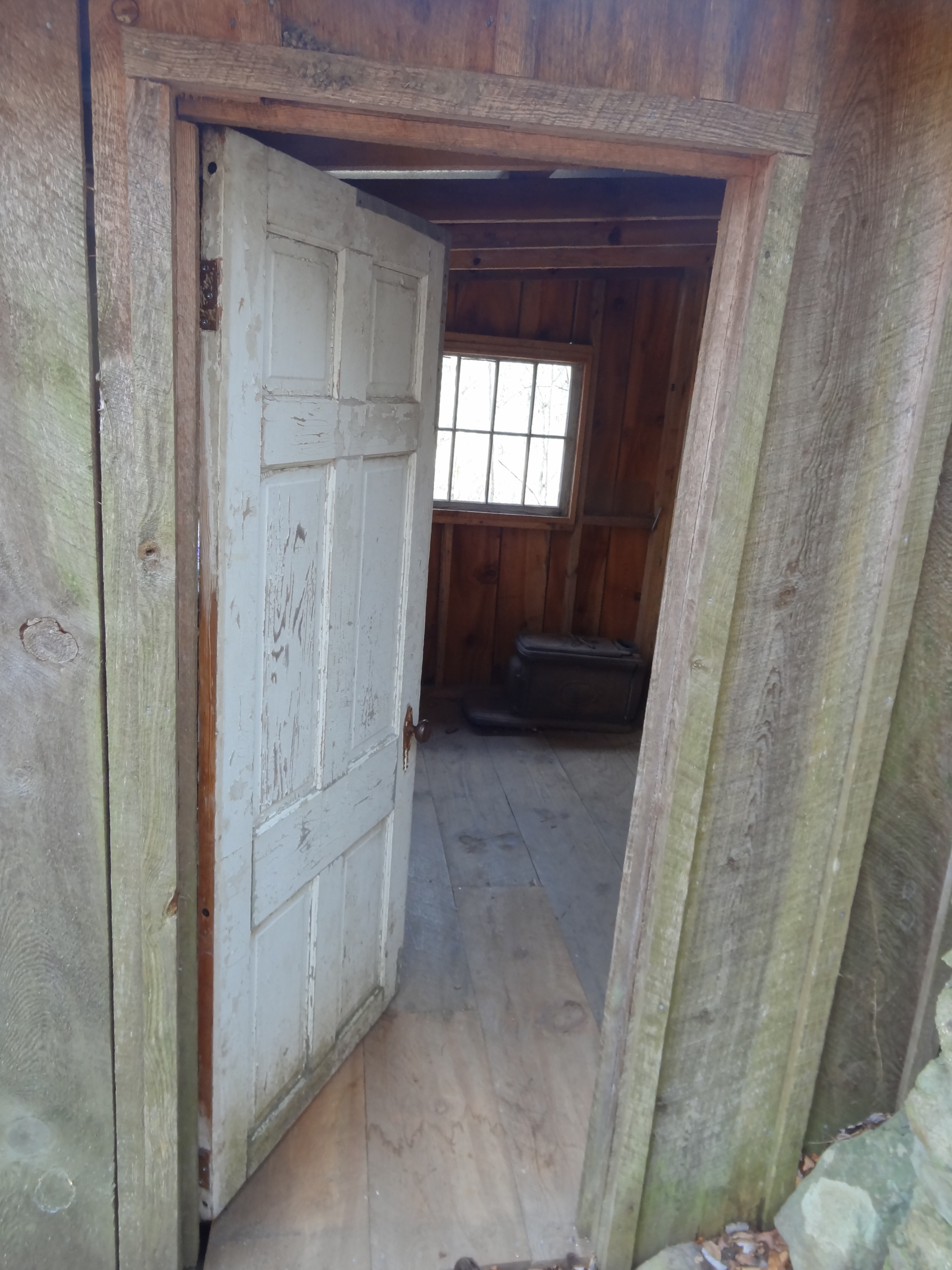
Kitchen Entrance

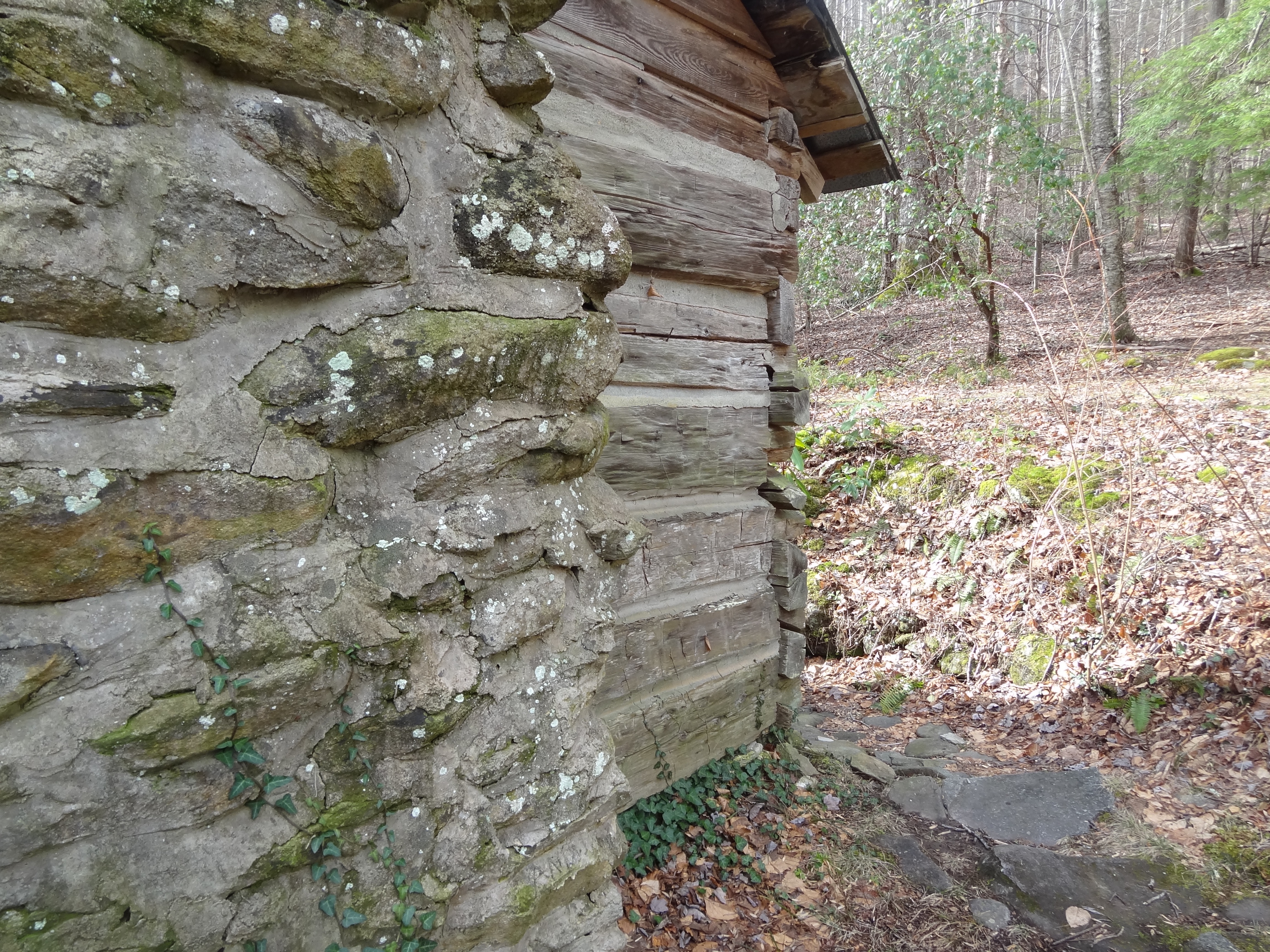
Exterior Chimney and corner detail with a stone retaining wall.

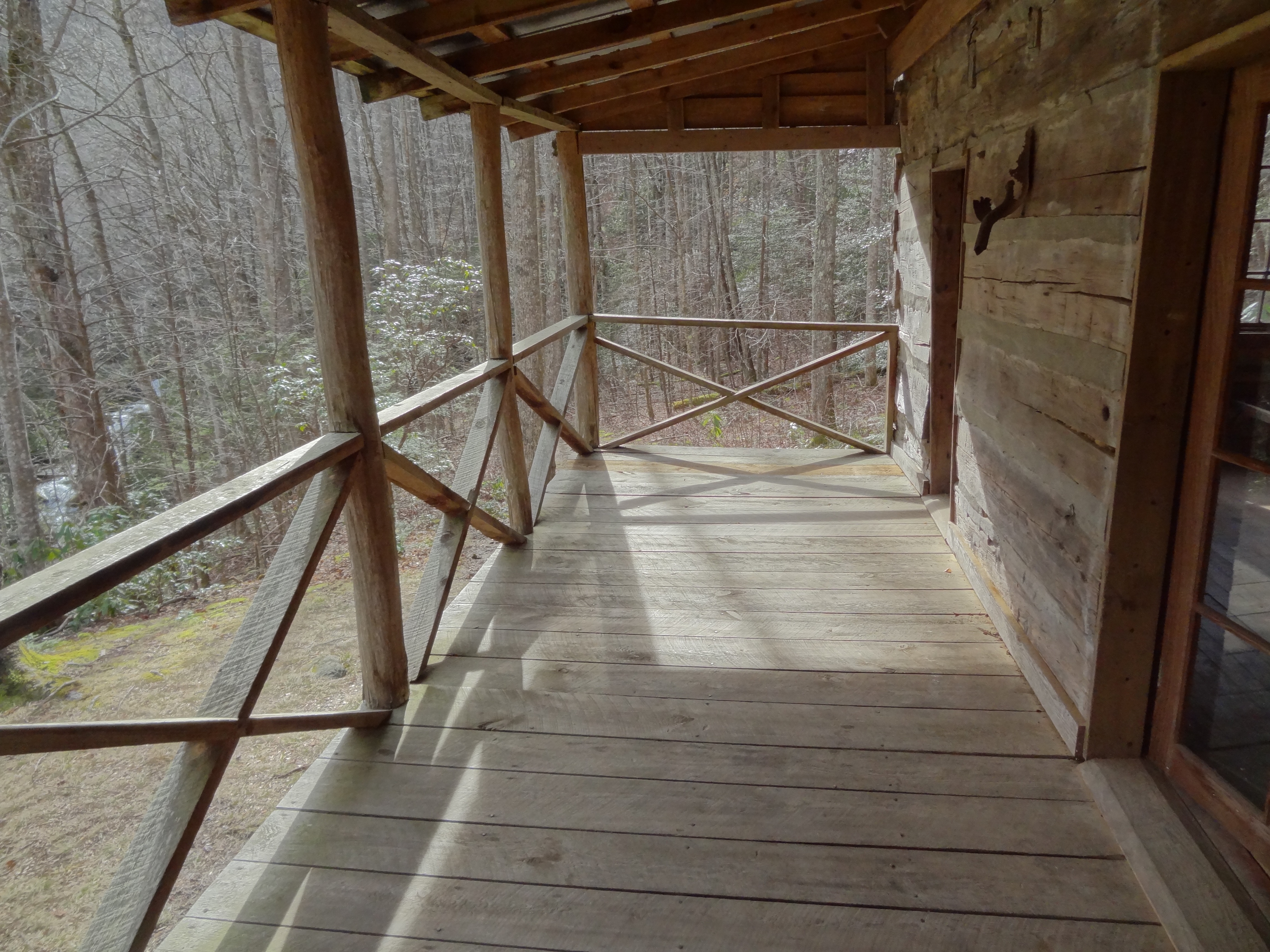
Porch

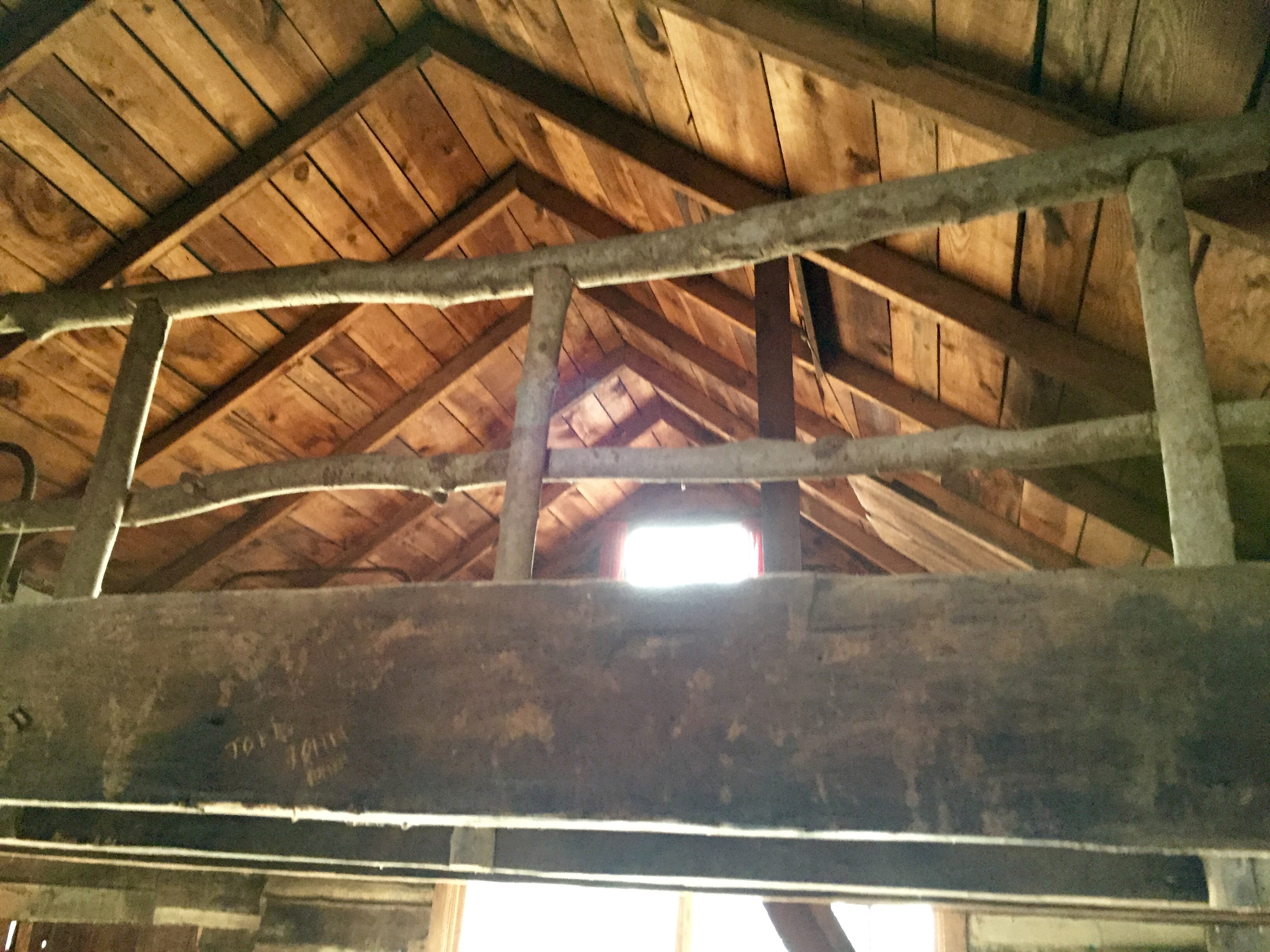
Interior Loft From Below

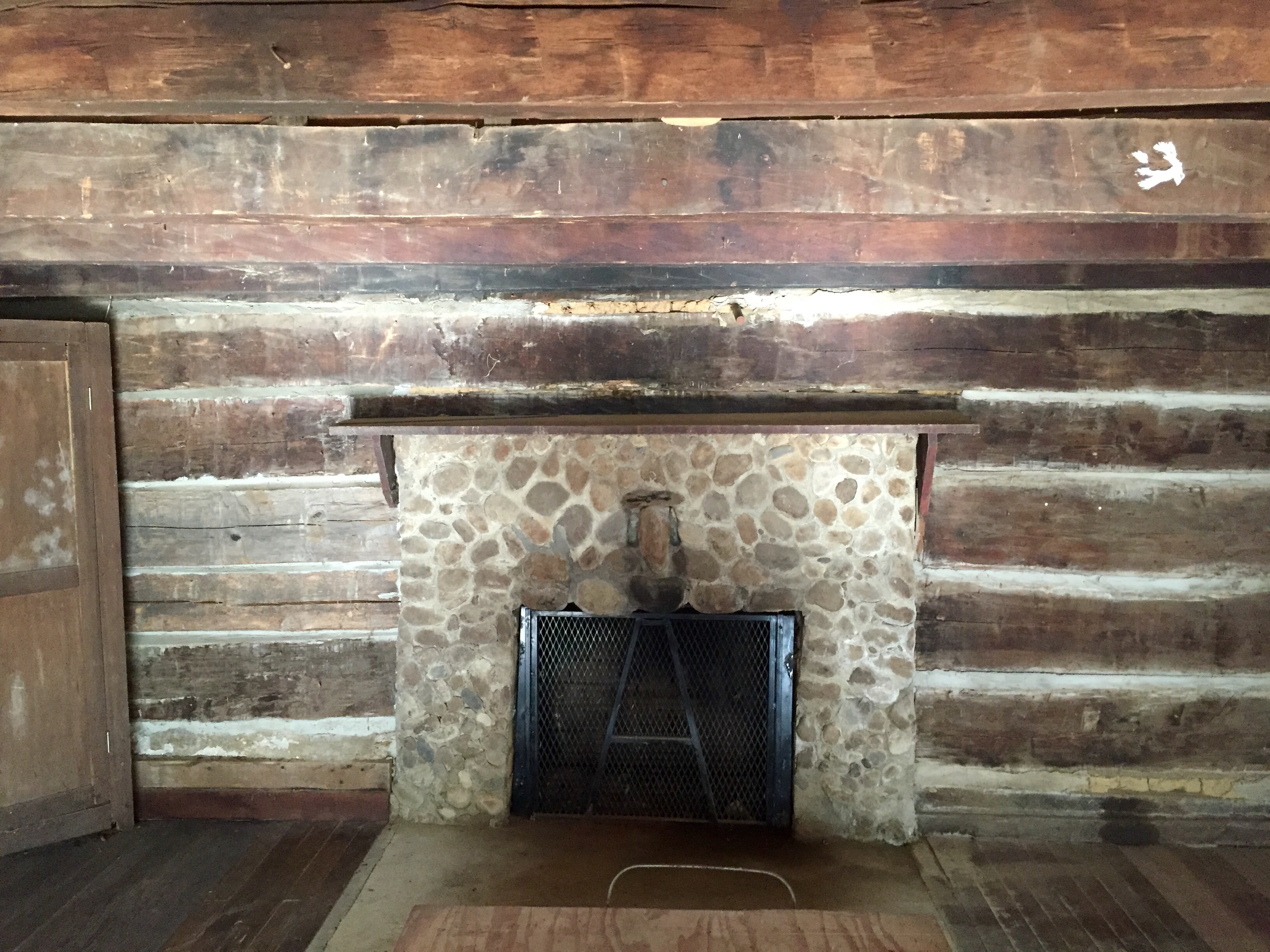
Fireplace

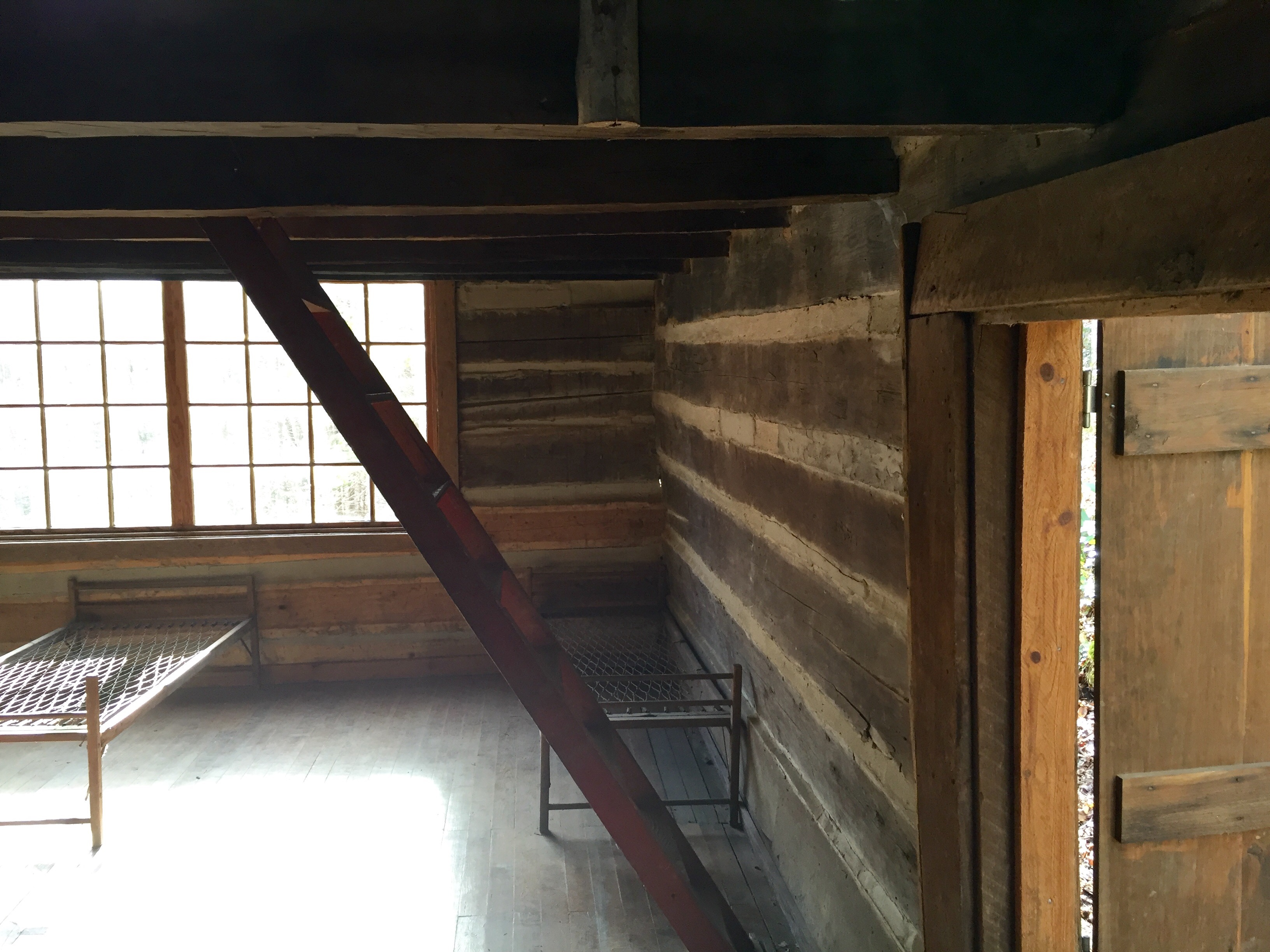
Interior Loft Ladder

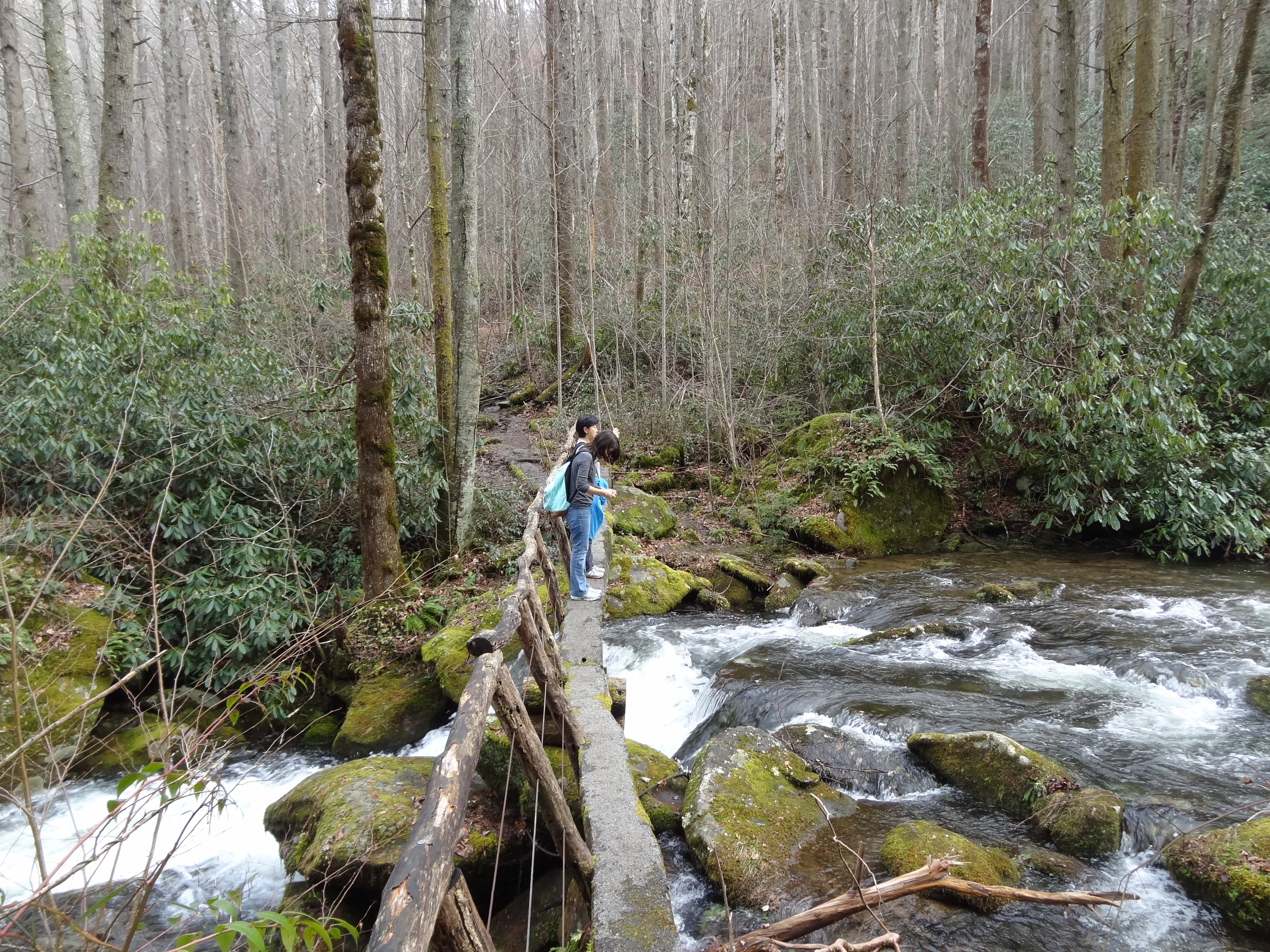
Bridge Crossing Jake's Creek below

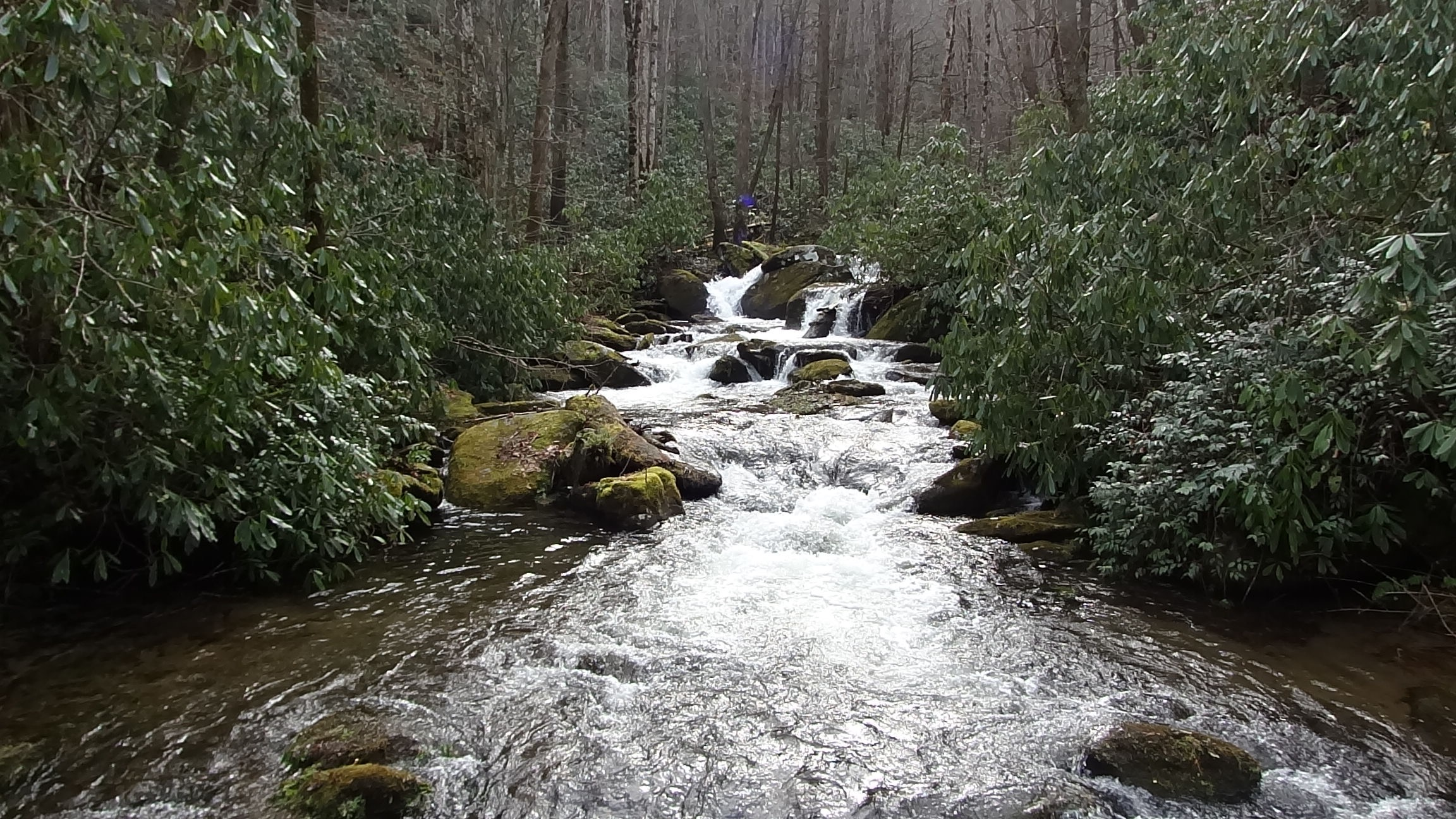
Jake's Creek Upstream View

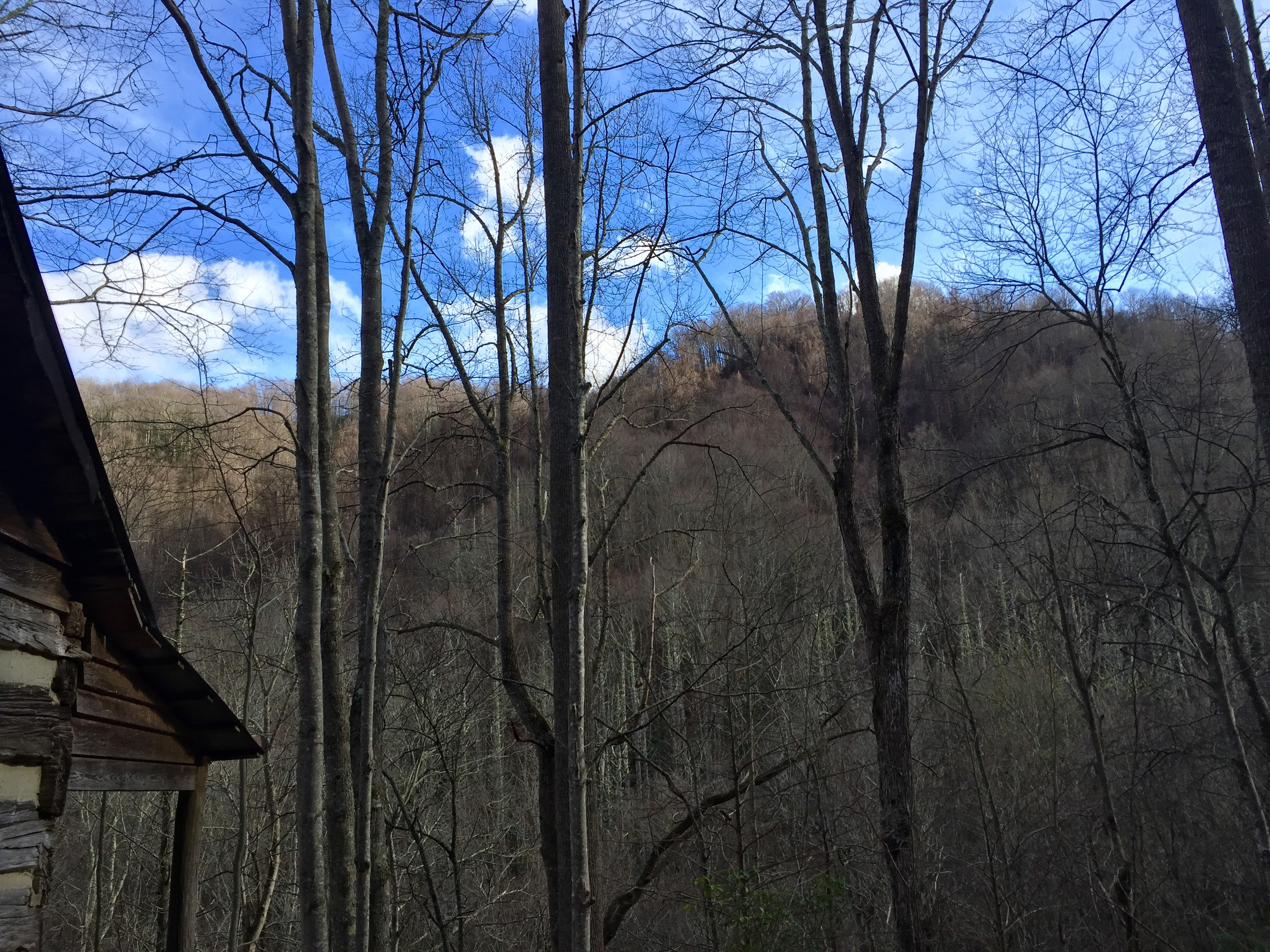
View across Jake's Creek Valley
