= Mayna Treanor Avent =

American painter

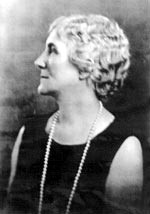
- Avent c. 1922
- Born: September 17, 1868; Nashville, Tennessee
- Died: January 2, 1959 (Aged 90); Sewanee, Tennessee
- Education: Art Academy of Cincinnati; Académie Julian
- Occupation: Painter
- Spouse: Frank Avent
- Children: James Avent; Mary Avent Adams
- Parent(s): Thomas O. Treanor; Mary Andrews Treanor

Mayna Treanor Avent (1868–1959) was an American painter.

== Early life ==
Mayna Treanor Avent was born on September 17, 1868, in Nashville, Tennessee.

Her father was Thomas O. Treanor and her mother, Mary Andrews Treanor. She grew up at Tulip Grove, an antebellum mansion opposite Andrew Jackson's The Hermitage. She studied painting at the Cincinnati Art Academy in Cincinnati, Ohio and at the Académie Julian in Paris, France for two years.

== Career ==
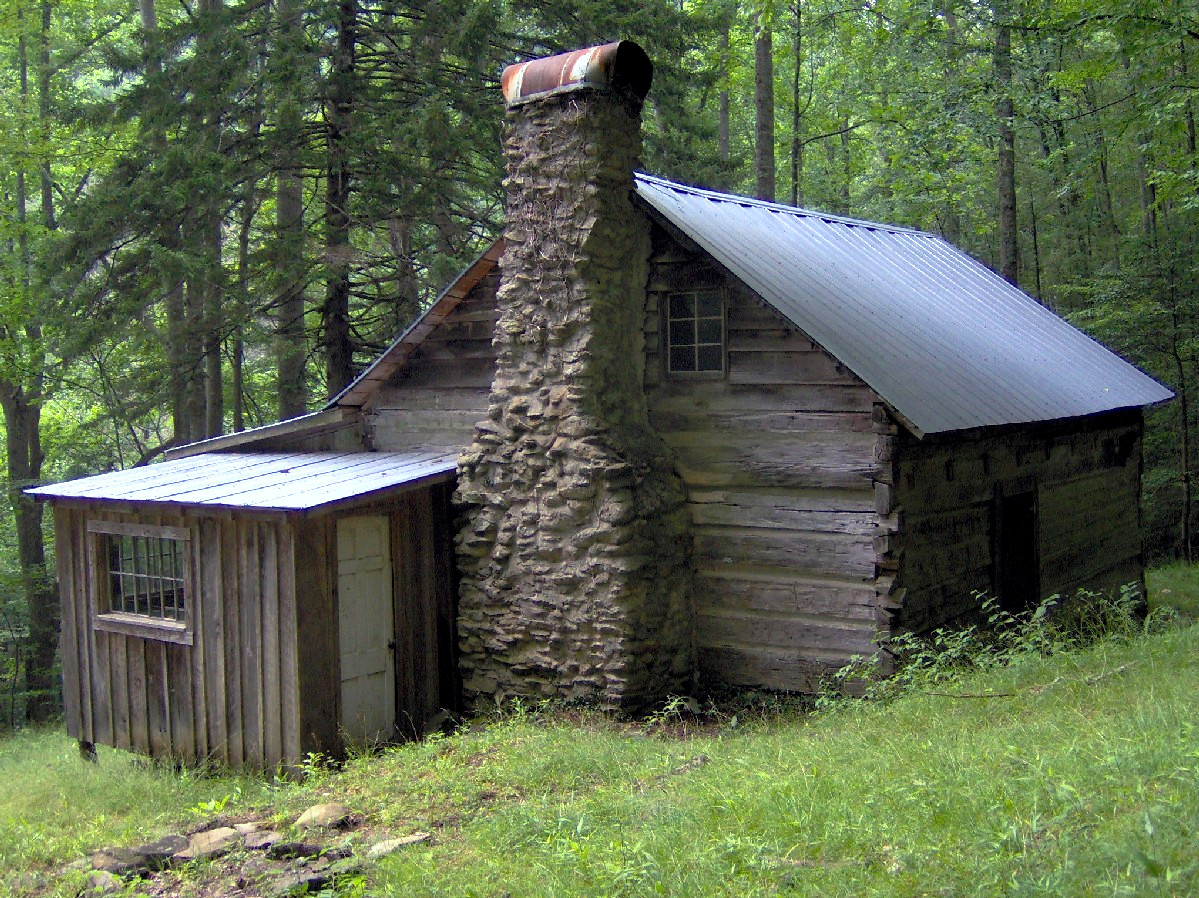
Mayna Treanor Avent Studio

Avent taught painting in Nashville, and exhibited her oil and watercolour paintings in Massachusetts, South Carolina and Tennessee. She often painted in what is now known as the Mayna Treanor Avent Studio on the Jake's Creek Trail in the Great Smoky Mountains National Park near Elkmont, Tennessee.

Avent was a member of the Nashville Studio Club, the Nashville Artists Guild, and the Centennial Club.

== Personal life and death ==
In 1891, she married Frank Avent, a lawyer for the State Railroad Commissioner from Murfreesboro, Tennessee. They had a son, James Avent (1895–1995). Avent spent her last three years with her son in Sewanee, Tennessee. She died on January 2, 1959.
