= Anakeesta Knob =

Mountain in Tennessee, United States

Highest point
- Elevation: 5,988 ft (1,825 m)
- Prominence: 248 ft (76 m)
- Isolation: 1.19 mi (1.92 km)
- Coordinates: 35°38′3″N 83°24′50″W

Geography
- Location: Sevier County, Tennessee, United States
- Parent range: Great Smoky Mountains

Climbing
- Easiest route: The Boulevard Trail

Anakeesta Knob is a mountain in the Great Smoky Mountains National Park in Tennessee. It has an elevation of 5,988 feet (1,825 m), and is accessible via The Boulevard Trail.

== Description ==
Anakeesta Knob is located in the central Great Smoky Mountains in Sevier County, Tennessee. It is situated between Mount LeConte to the northwest, and Mount Kephart and Charlies Bunion to the east. At an elevation of 5,988 feet (1,825 m), Anakeesta Knob is the tallest mountain in Tennessee with an elevation less than 6,000 feet (1,800 m). The mountain is largely forested, and contains exposed rock outcroppings on its summit. Anakeesta Knob is accessible via The Boulevard Trail, which runs between Mount Le Conte and the Appalachian Trail at Mount Kephart. The name "Anakeesta" means "the place of high ground" or "the place of the Balsams" in the Cherokee language.
