= The Boulevard Trail =

Hiking trail in Tennessee, United States

Coordinates: 35.6387°N 83.4179°W

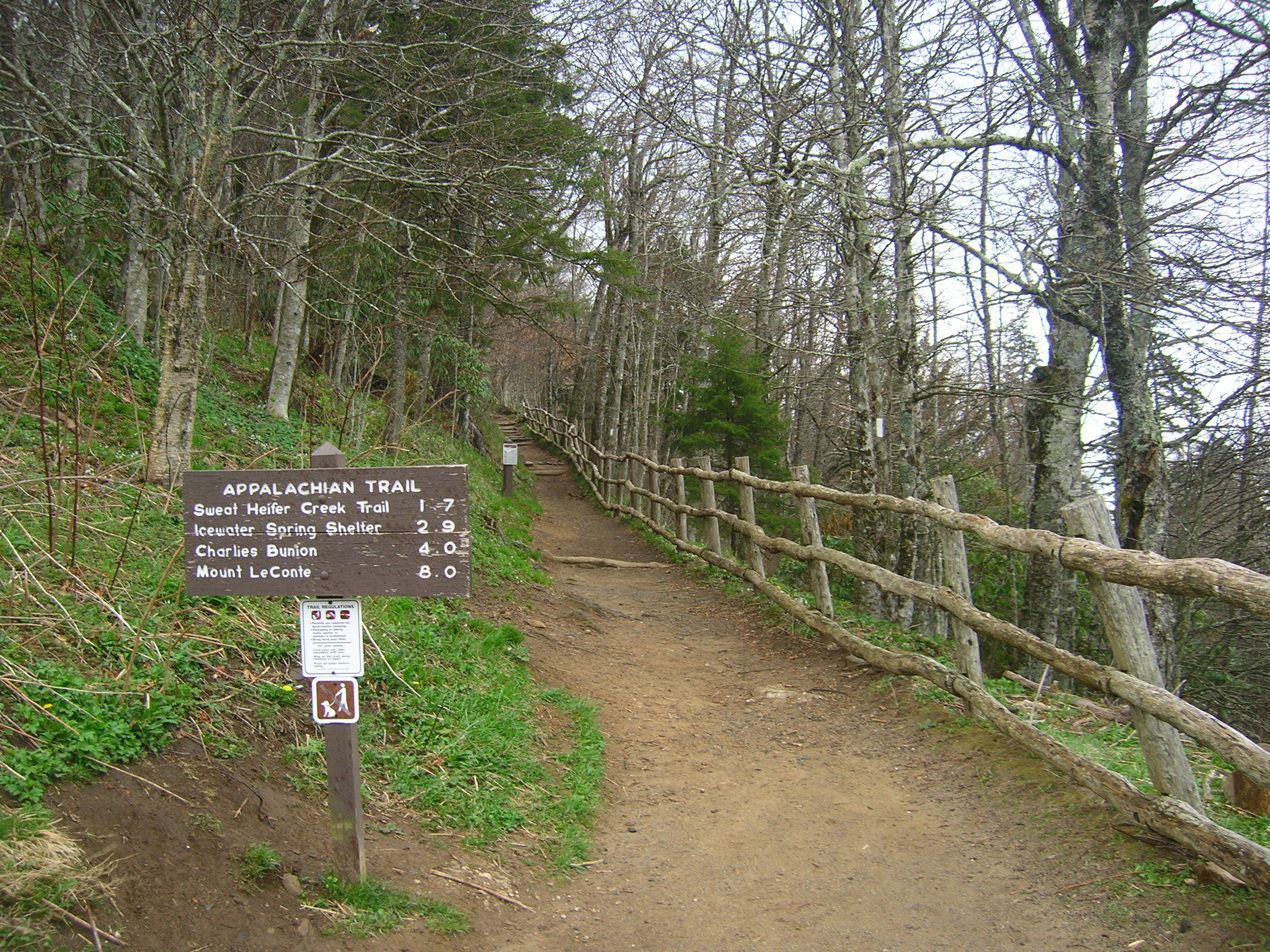
- The starting point on the hike to Mount Le Conte is here at the Appalachian Trail, which leads into The Boulevard Trail shortly into the hike.
- Length: 5.3 (8.0 to LeConte Lodge) mi; 8.5 (12.9 to LeConte Lodge) km
- Location: Great Smoky Mountains National Park, Tennessee, United States
- Trailheads: Newfound Gap, Tennessee (Trailhead at Newfound Gap, off U.S. Highway 441 [Newfound Gap Road], between Gatlinburg, Tennessee and Cherokee, North Carolina); Terminus near the LeConte Lodge
- Use: Hiking
- Elevation change: 1,080 ft (330 m)
- Highest point: Summit of Mount Le Conte, 6,593 ft (2,010 m)
- Lowest point: Trailhead
- Difficulty: Moderate
- Season: Spring to Fall
- Sights: Newfound Gap, Great Smoky Mountains
- Hazards: Ice (in winter), loose rocks, narrow trail

The Boulevard Trail is an American hiking trail in the Great Smoky Mountains National Park, in Sevier County, Tennessee. The trail ascends Mount Le Conte, the tallest (and sixth highest) mountain east of the Mississippi River and offers high-elevation views before terminating near the LeConte Lodge.

== Vital information ==
- The Boulevard Trail is the longest route to the summit of Mount Le Conte (elev. 6,593 ft (2,010 m); 2,010 m)
- The path follows the Appalachian Trail for 2.7 miles (4.3 km), between Newfound Gap and Charlie's Bunion
- Never during the hike does the trail dip below 5,000 feet (1,500 m)
- The trailhead is located at Newfound Gap, off U.S. Highway 441 (Newfound Gap Road), between Gatlinburg, Tennessee and Cherokee, North Carolina, on either end of the Great Smoky Mountains National Park

== Landmarks/overlooks ==
- High Top
- Mount Le Conte backcountry shelter
- Myrtle Point (via spur trail)
- Newfound Gap (near the trailhead)
- The Jumpoff (via spur trail)

== Trail synopsis ==
=== Appalachian Trail to Boulevard Trailhead ===
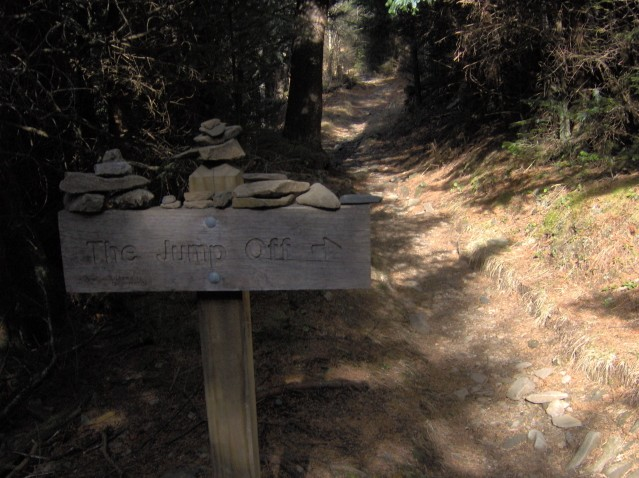
The Boulevard Trail at its Jumpoff Trail junction

The Boulevard Trail connects the summit of Mount Le Conte with the Appalachian Trail along the main crest of the Great Smokies. The trail is named after the rugged gap situated between Mount Le Conte and Mount Kephart. The trailhead is located along the Appalachian Trail 2.7 miles (4.3 km) east of Newfound Gap. Unlike the other trails leading to the top of Mount Le Conte, the Boulevard begins near 5,500 ft (1,700 m), thus the overall elevation gain along the trail is dramatically less than that of all other routes. However, this oft-quoted statistic is a bit misleading, as the trail contains many dips and subsequent rises over its eight miles (13 km) course. Still, the high elevation provides for a much cooler hike, making the trail more attractive in summer months. The Appalachian Trail between Newfound Gap and its Boulevard Trail junction is rather gentle, providing some peeks through the brush of the surrounding mountains. At the junction, the Appalachian Trail continues east to Charlies Bunion and the eastern Smokies, whereas the Boulevard Trail heads north across the flank of Mount Kephart en route to Le Conte.

=== The Boulevard Trailhead to LeConte Lodge ===
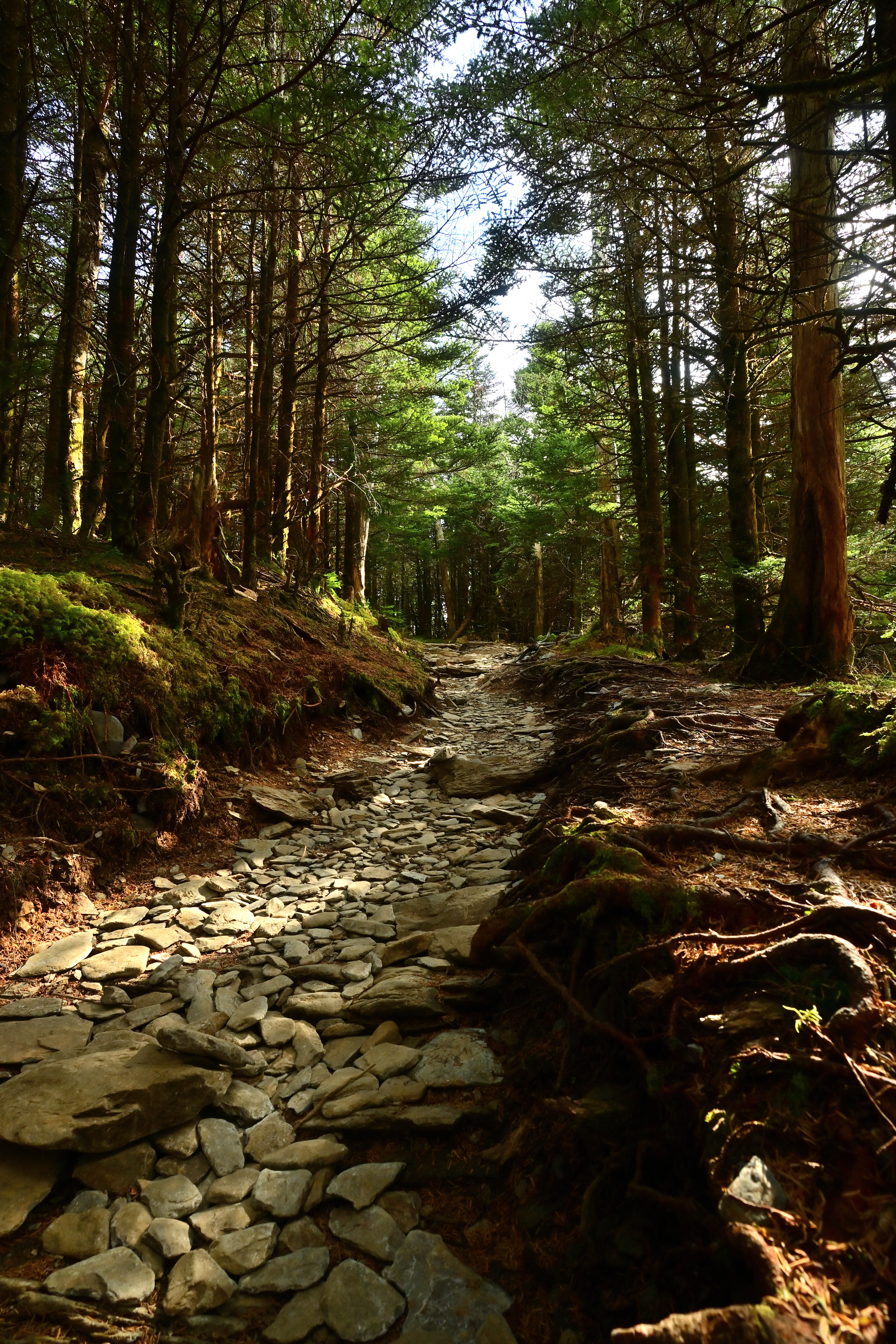
The trail between the summit of Mount Le Conte and the lodge

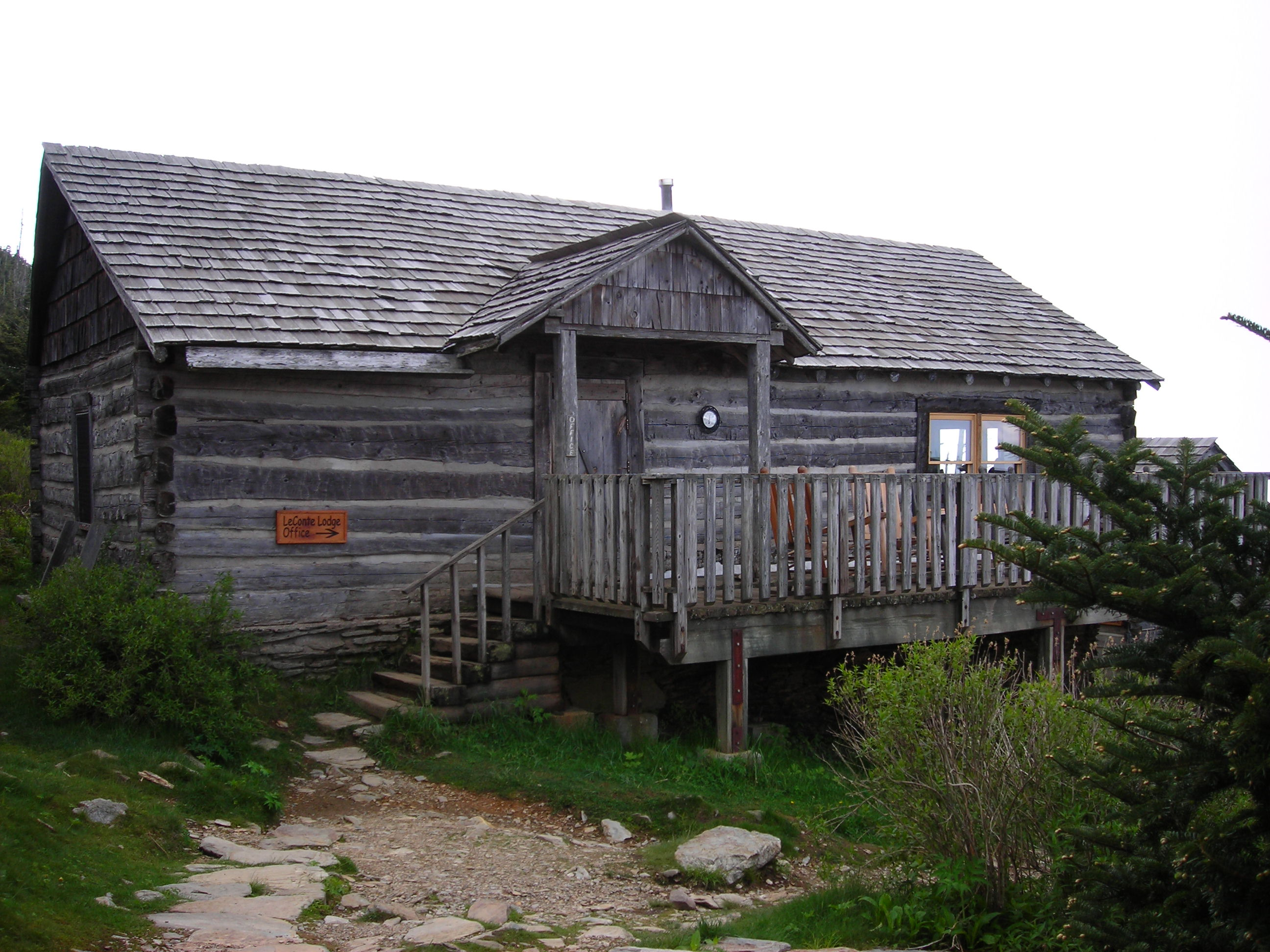
The office of the LeConte Lodge mountaintop "resort" near the summit of Mount Le Conte is the hub of activities both at the lodge and on the mountain.

Approximately 0.2 miles (0.32 km) from the Boulevard-Appalachian Trail junction is the Jumpoff Trail, a 0.3-mile (0.48 km) side trail that crosses the summit of Mount Kephart en route to a 1,000-foot (300 m) cliff overlooking the eastern Smokies and Sevier County. About a mile past the Jumpoff Trail junction, the Boulevard Trail descends for appx. 500 feet (150 m) before rising again to the top of 5,988 feet (1,825 m) Anakeesta Knob. The trail then descends once again, before rising along the eastern side of Mount Le Conte. At 7.5 miles (12.1 km) the trail comes to a 0.2-mile (0.32 km) spur trail leading to one of the four peaks of the Le Conte massif, Myrtle Point. Myrtle Point is particularly known for its fantastic sunrises, as it provides a clear view to the east. Just beyond the side trail to Myrtle Point, the Boulevard Trail ascends to High Top, the highest point on Mount Le Conte (6,593 ft; 2,010 m). In the vein of an ancient Cherokee custom whereby it is said that passersby should add a stone to a pile of rocks as a peace offering to evil spirits, a substantial rock pile has developed at the summit of High Top. From High Top, the Boulevard Trail continues for another 0.2 miles (0.32 km) to the Mount Le Conte backcountry shelter (modeled after those found on the Appalachian Trail) and then a short distance to LeConte Lodge, where the trail terminates at its junction with the Alum Cave Trail and the Trillium Gap Trail. LeConte Lodge is the only commercial lodging available in the national park, as it operates about 10 rustic cabins with no electricity or appliances. The lodge also operates an office which provides t-shirts and other merchandise for hikers and various amenities for guests of the lodge. A final spur trail leads 0.2 miles (0.32 km) from LeConte Lodge to the summit of Cliff Tops, which looks out over Le Conte's western flank into the central Smokies.

== Sources ==
Manning, Russ; Sondra Jamieson (1991). The Best of the Great Smoky Mountains National Park: A Hiker's Guide to Trails and Attractions. Norris, Tennessee: Mountain Laurel Place. ISBN 0-9625122-2-2..
