= Caton =

Caton may refer to:

== Places ==
- Caton, Devon, England, UK; a location
- Caton, Lancashire, England, UK; a village
- Caton, New York, USA; a town
- Caton, Tennessee, USA; an unincorporated community

== Other ==
- Caton (surname)
- Caton Theodorian (1871–1939), Romanian playwright
- French ship Caton (1777), later HMS Caton

== See also ==
- including further people with the surname
