= Reagan, Tennessee =

Reagan may refer to:

- Reagan, Henderson County, Tennessee
- Reagan, McMinn County, Tennessee
- Reagantown, Tennessee, in Sevier County
- former name for Decatur, Tennessee, in Meigs County
