= Shady Grove, Sevier County, Tennessee =

Shady Grove, Tennessee
- Unincorporated community
- Location within Tennessee Location within the United States
- Coordinates: 35°47′02″N 83°27′42″W
- Country: United States
- State: Tennessee
- County: Sevier
- Elevation: 1,201 ft (366 m)
- Time zone: UTC-5 (Eastern (EST))
  - Summer (DST): UTC-4 (EDT)
- Area code: 865
- GNIS feature ID: 1315903

Shady Grove is an unincorporated community in Sevier County, Tennessee, United States. Shady Grove is located along Tennessee State Route 454 5.2 miles (8.4 km) east of Pigeon Forge.
