= Cladonia appalachensis =

Conservation status
- Endangered (IUCN 3.1)

Scientific classification
- Kingdom: Fungi
- Division: Ascomycota
- Class: Lecanoromycetes
- Order: Lecanorales
- Family: Cladoniaceae
- Genus: Cladonia
- Species: C. appalachensis

Binomial name
- Cladonia appalachensis Yoshim. & Sharp ex Lendemer & R.C.Harris (2013)

Species of lichen-forming fungus

Cladonia appalachensis is a species of lichen-forming fungus in the family Cladoniaceae, native to the southern Appalachians region in the United States. Described as a new species in 2013, its distribution is limited to the Great Smoky Mountains National Park, where it grows exclusively on Anakeesta rock outcrops along the ridge separating North Carolina and Tennessee. Due to its limited distribution and shrinking population, C. appalachensis is classified as endangered on the IUCN Red List.

== Taxonomy ==
During fieldwork in the Great Smoky Mountains of eastern North America, an unusual population of the genus Cladonia, notably different from other known species in the genus, was found growing on the shaded face of a massive rock outcrop at a high elevation. It was initially collected about fifty years ago by Aaron John Sharp, who, along with his colleague Isao Yoshimura, gave it the manuscript name Cladonia "appalachensis". In the 1970s, Teuvo Ahti also encountered a specimen of the same species collected by Rudolf Becking, recognizing it as distinct and referring to it as Cladonia "subpeltastica". Despite being known for decades, this species had not been formally described. In 2013, James Lendemer and Richard C. Harris validated the name originally proposed by Sharp and Yoshimura, formally describing it as Cladonia appalachensis, a narrow endemic to Anakeesta Formation rock outcrops in the Great Smoky Mountains. In the 2020 IUCN assessment, which has Lendemer as the primary author, the species epithet is spelled appalachiensis, and the original spelling is deemed an orthographic error.

== Description ==
The primary thallus of C. appalachensis was not observed in the type material. The reproductive structures, called podetia, grow upright but are often slightly bent and can form dense, intertwined clusters that create a mat-like appearance. These podetia are usually between 2 and 3 centimeters (cm) in height and are 0.4 to 0.8 millimeters (mm) thick. They branch in an irregular, forked pattern, and their growth is indeterminate, meaning they can continue growing under favorable conditions. The podetia are generally a whitish-grey color, though they can appear brownish from a distance, especially near their base, which darkens to brown or black in the lowest parts.

The podetial surface has a dull appearance, with a weak pruinose (frosted) texture in the upper parts. It lacks soredia, which are common reproductive structures in many lichens. The surface is mostly covered by a patchy cortex, with smooth sections in the upper parts and a warty, more distinct pattern in the lower portions. The walls of the podetia are about 0.1 mm thick, composed of tightly packed hyphae, with a narrow, smooth central cavity. The pycnidia, which are small, flask-like structures that produce asexual spores (conidia]), are brown and are found at the tips of the podetia, although mature pycnidia were not observed in the type material.

Chemically, Cladonia appalachensis contains squamatic acid, and it shows a distinctive reaction to ultraviolet light, fluorescing blue-white under UV.

=== Similar species ===
Cladonia appalachensis is similar to Cladonia peltastica, but it differs in its habitat and chemical composition. Unlike C. peltastica, C. appalachensis is primarily found on rock outcrops in the southern Appalachian Mountains and lacks usnic acid, which is a compound found in many other lichen species.

== Distribution and habitat ==
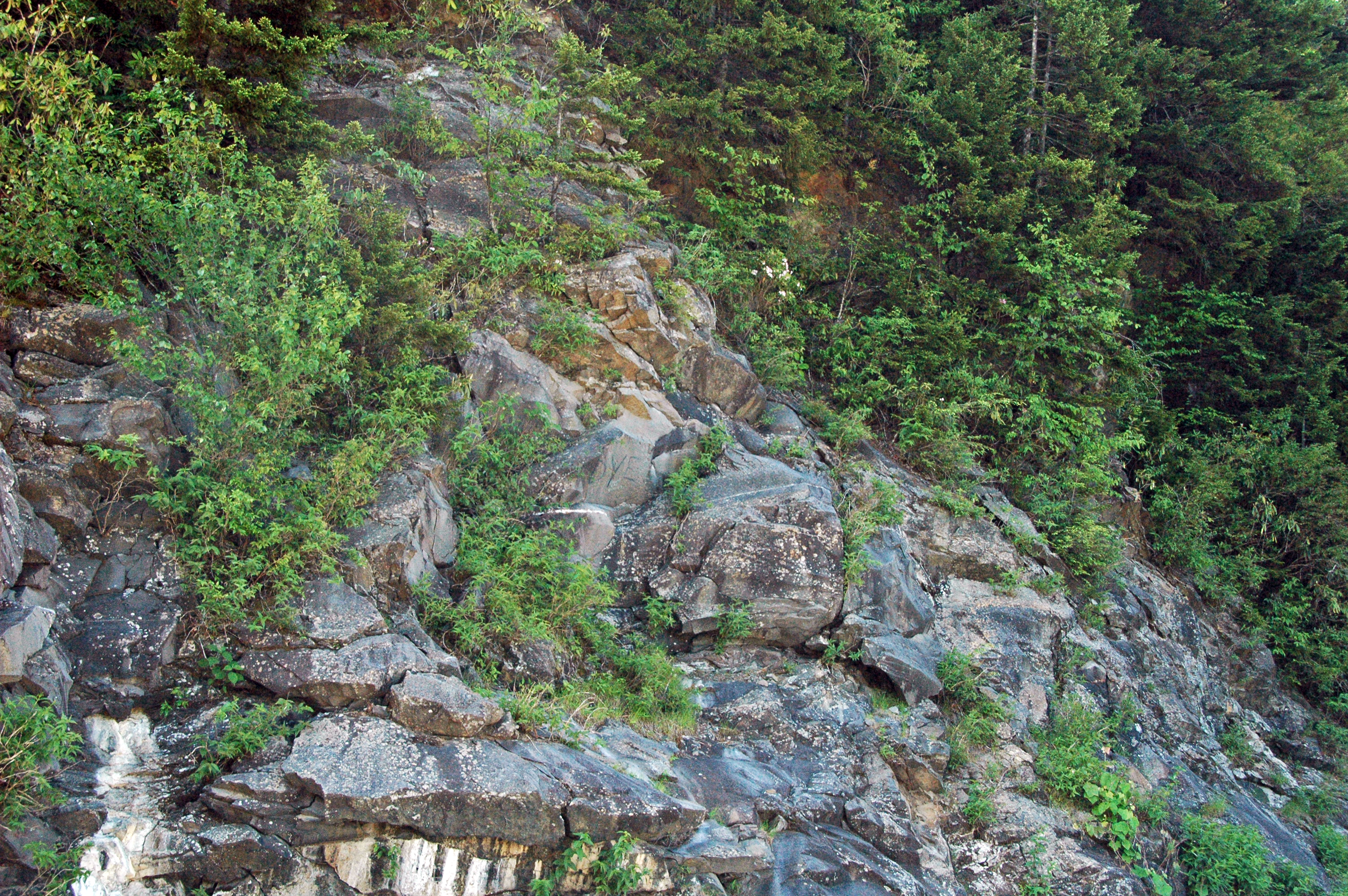
The distribution of Cladonia appalachensis is restricted to rock outcrops in the Anakeesta Formation.

Cladonia appalachensis is restricted to a small geographical area within the Great Smoky Mountains National Park, growing exclusively on Anakeesta rock, an iron-rich substrate. The species occupies a very limited range, with an area of occupancy of just 6 km^{2} (2.3 sq mi). Only three populations have been documented, despite thorough surveys across potential habitats. Cladonia appalachensis is found at elevations ranging from 1,480 to 1,990 m (4,860 to 6,530 ft), where it inhabits fragile cliffside ecosystems. It grows exclusively on Anakeesta rock outcrops, which are often located near well-traveled trails, making them susceptible to disturbance from foot traffic. This rock formation is characterized by the presence of iron sulfide-rich slate, shale, and sandstones with a distinctive reddish-brown color.

The population of C. appalachensis is considered to be in decline. There are only three known subpopulations of C. appalachensis, all located within the Great Smoky Mountains National Park. Two populations documented in the 1970s have since disappeared, and ongoing declines have been observed in areas close to heavily visited tourist trails. Due to its limited distribution and shrinking population, C. appalachensis is classified as endangered on the IUCN Red List. The assessment is based on its restricted extent of occurrence and area of occupancy, the small number of remaining locations, and documented population decreases.

== Threats and conservation ==
Cladonia appalachensis faces threats primarily due to human activities and environmental shifts. Being located near popular hiking routes, the lichen is vulnerable to physical damage from foot traffic, which can degrade its sensitive rock outcrop habitat. Furthermore, environmental changes, such as alterations in cloud cover and humidity in high-altitude regions of the Southern Appalachians, likely linked to climate change, are contributing to adverse impacts on its habitat. These factors together are leading to a continued decline in habitat quality and overall population numbers.

Conservation efforts for C. appalachensis are aimed at minimizing the impact of human activities and maintaining stable population levels. While the species benefits from being within the protected area of the Great Smoky Mountains National Park, further active measures are necessary to address the effects of heavy tourist traffic. Strategies include visitor education, installing signage to keep hikers on designated trails, and restricting access to vulnerable habitats if needed.

== See also ==
- List of Cladonia species
