= Charles Inman =

American politician (1810–1899)

Member of the Tennessee House of Representatives
- In office May 25, 1865 – October 3, 1869
- Preceded by: Samuel McCammon
- Succeeded by: William R. McBath

Personal details
- Born: February 17, 1810 Cocke County, Tennessee
- Died: April 1899 (aged 89) Sevier County, Tennessee
- Resting place: Fair Garden Cemetery; Sevier County, Tennessee
- Party: Radical Republican
- Spouse: Priscilla (Davis) Inman
- Children: 10
- Occupation: Farmer

Military service
- Branch/service: United States Army
- Years of service: 1862–1865
- Rank: Major
- Unit: 2nd Tennessee Cavalry
- Battles/wars: American Civil War

Charles Inman (February 17, 1810 – April 1899) was an American politician, soldier and farmer, who served two terms in the Tennessee House of Representatives, from 1865 to 1869. A Radical Republican, he typically supported the initiatives of Tennessee's postwar governor, William G. Brownlow. He voted in favor of the ratification of the Fourteenth Amendment, and supported legislation punishing former Confederates.

Inman remained loyal to the Union during the Civil War. He was a delegate to the East Tennessee Convention in 1861, and later served as a major in the Union Army. He was captured and jailed by Confederate authorities in November 1864.

== Early life and Civil War ==
Inman was born in Cocke County, Tennessee on February 17, 1810, the son of Jeremiah Inman and his wife Anna Prudence Bottom. He likely attended field schools as a child. By 1850, he had moved with his family to the Fair Garden area of rural northeastern Sevier County, where he established a farm. According to family tradition, he fought in the Mexican–American War, but his name is not included in the list of Mexican–American War veterans in the Tennessee Archives. In 1856, he was among the commissioners appointed by the Tennessee General Assembly to oversee the construction of the Knoxville, Sevierville and Paint Rock Railroad.

When the Civil War broke out in 1861, Inman, like most Sevier Countians, remained loyal to the Union. He was a member of the Sevier County delegation at the Greeneville session of the East Tennessee Convention in June 1861. This convention, which met a few days after Tennessee voted to secede and join the Confederacy, petitioned the state government to allow the counties of East Tennessee to form a separate state that would remain part of the Union.

After Confederate forces occupied East Tennessee, Inman fled to Kentucky. He joined the 2nd Tennessee Volunteer Cavalry in December 1862 with the rank of major. This unit, which consisted primarily of Union loyalists from Knox, Blount, and Sevier counties, was commanded by Colonel Daniel M. Ray, who had been one of Inman's fellow Sevier County delegates at the East Tennessee Union Convention. Inman marched with this unit to join forces commanded by General William Rosecrans in Middle Tennessee. After the Battle of Stones River, Inman fell ill, and was discharged on March 10, 1863.

In the weeks following his discharge, Inman was appointed Provost Marshal in East Tennessee by General Ambrose Burnside. He was captured near Morristown, Tennessee, in November 1864, and imprisoned in Virginia. He was released by Confederate authorities on February 20, 1865, and rejoined the 2nd Tennessee shortly afterward. He was mustered out at Nashville on May 6, 1865.

== Postwar politics ==
In April 1865, Samuel McCammon, who had been elected to Sevier County's seat in the Tennessee House of Representatives, died suddenly, and Inman was elected to fill the vacancy. He was seated on May 25, 1865. Inman generally supported Governor William G. "Parson" Brownlow's legislative agenda, which aimed to reintegrate Tennessee into the Union and punish former Confederates. At an August 1865 political rally in Knoxville, Brownlow's son, John B. Brownlow, praised Inman for supporting the "franchise bill," which barred ex-Confederates from voting.

By 1866, the Tennessee General Assembly, though dominated by Unionists, had divided into two factions: the Radical Republicans, who supported Brownlow and favored harsh policies toward former Confederates and the extension of the right to vote for freed slaves, and the Conservative Republicans, who supported President Andrew Johnson and favored more lenient policies toward former Confederates. Inman, who was squarely in the Radical camp, voted in favor of a second, more contentious franchise bill in May 1866 that gave Brownlow the power to throw out entire counties' voter registrations. In July 1866, Inman voted to ratify the Fourteenth Amendment, which extended civil rights to minorities. Tennessee's ratification of this amendment allowed it to become the first former Confederate state to be readmitted to the Union.

In September 1866, Inman was one of Tennessee's delegates to the Radical Republican convention in Philadelphia. In March of the following year, he represented Sevier County at the Radicals' state convention in Nashville. At the party's Knox County convention in April 1867, Inman was praised for his "patriotic adherence to the principles of the Union party." That same month, Inman chaired the party's Sevier County convention, which called for continued disfranchisement of ex-Confederates, endorsed the "tried patriot and firm champion" Brownlow for governor, and denounced Conservatives for aiming to "give the control of the state to the rebels."

Inman was nominated for reelection in May 1867, though this time he would be representing a floterial district that encompassed Knox and Sevier counties. In the general election in August of that year, he defeated his opponent by more than a thousand votes out of about 4,000 cast. His brother, Shadrach, was also elected to the House, representing their native Cocke County.

Charles Inman's House assignments for the 1867–1869 term included the Committee on Finance, Ways and Means, the Committee on Military Affairs, and the Committee on Tippling and Tippling Houses. In October 1867, he introduced a bill that would appropriate funds for the establishment of a hospital in Knoxville. He generally supported railroad legislation, voted in favor of a bill that provided certain protections for merchants, and voted to incorporate the Knoxville Iron Company. He voted for a bill that barred common carriers from discriminating on the basis of race, though he also voted in favor of a poll tax. Inman supported legislation that provided for the reorganization and maintenance of the state's public schools, and voted for the formation of a committee to investigate the mishandling of federal agricultural school funds.

In August 1868, Inman voted for a measure authorizing Brownlow to declare martial law in any county he deemed necessary, a response to the growing threat of the Ku Klux Klan. He voted for a bill authorizing the state to seek compensation from the federal government for damages suffered during the war by the state's Unionists, and voted against a January 1869 measure that would have restored voting rights to some former Confederates. In October 1867, he cast his vote for Brownlow to fill one of the state's soon-to-be-vacant U.S. Senate seats.

== Later life ==
After his second term ended, Inman returned to his farm in Fair Garden, and remained only marginally active in politics. He died in Fair Garden on April 9 or 16, 1899, and was interred at the family graveyard in Sevier County.

== See also ==
- Robert H. Hodsden
