= Caton, Tennessee =

Caton's Chapel
- Unincorporated community
- Location within the state of Tennessee Caton's Chapel (the United States)
- Coordinates: 35°48′01″N 83°27′03″W
- Country: United States
- State: Tennessee
- County: Sevier
- Elevation: 1,109 ft (338 m)
- Time zone: UTC-5 (Eastern (EST))
  - Summer (DST): UTC-4 (EDT)
- GNIS feature ID: 1314799

Caton's Chapel is an unincorporated community in Sevier County, Tennessee, USA. It is accessible via State Route 454 (Birds Creek Road) and Catons Chapel Road, near State Route 416 (Pittman Center Road). Dolly Parton was raised and attended elementary school in Caton's Chapel. It is referred to by some natives (the few that remain) as "The Chapel".

== Geography ==
Caton has a mean elevation of 1,109 feet (338 metres).
