= 2nd Tennessee Cavalry Regiment (Union) =

- Active: July 1862 to July 6, 1865
- Country: United States
- Allegiance: Union
- Branch: Cavalry
- Engagements: Battle of Stones River; Tullahoma Campaign; Battle of Chickamauga; Battle of Nashville

The 2nd Tennessee Cavalry Regiment was a cavalry regiment that served in the Union Army during the American Civil War. It was also known as 2nd East Tennessee Cavalry.

== Service ==
The 2nd Tennessee Cavalry was organized July through November 1862 in eastern Tennessee and mustered in for a three year enlistment under the command of Colonel Daniel M. Ray. Subordinate officers included Lieutenant Colonel William R. Cook, and majors George W. Hutsell, Charles Inman, William R. Macbeth, and William F. Prosser. The unit was composed primarily of Southern unionists from the Tennessee counties of Knox, Sevier and Blount. Notably, among the enlisted were two women pretending to be men: Frances Elizabeth Quinn and Sarah Bradbury. The regiment's original muster rolls were destroyed at Nolensville, Tennessee on December 30, 1862. The regiment re-mustered at Murfreesboro, Tennessee on January 26, 1863.

to Oct 1862:	The regiment was attached to 7th Division, Army of the Ohio.
to Nov 1862:	District of West Virginia, Department of the Ohio
Nov 1862:	Unattached Cavalry, Cavalry Division, XIV Corps, Army of the Cumberland
to Mar 1863:	Reserve Cavalry, Cavalry Division, Department of the Cumberland
to Jan 1864:	2nd Brigade, 1st Cavalry Division, Army of the Cumberland
to Apr 1864:	3rd Brigade, Cavalry Division, XVI Corps, Department of the Tennessee
to Jun 1864:	1st Brigade, 4th Division, Cavalry Corps, Department of the Cumberland
to Oct 1864:	District of North Alabama, Department of the Cumberland
to Nov 1864:	1st Brigade, 4th Division, Cavalry Corps, Military Division Mississippi
to Mar 1865:	1st Brigade, 7th Division, Cavalry Corps, Military Division Mississippi
to May 1865:	Department of Mississippi
to Jul 1865:	Department of the Cumberland
06 Jul 1865:	The 2nd Tennessee Cavalry mustered out of service at Nashville, Tennessee

== Detailed service ==
to Sep 1862:	Operations about Cumberland Gap, TN.
17 Sep - 03 Oct:	Evacuation of Cumberland Gap and retreat to Greenupsburg, KY
to Nov:	Operations in the Kanawha Valley, VA
	Ordered to Cincinnati, Ohio, then Louisville, KY, and Nashville, TN.
26 - 30 Dec:	Advance on Murfreesboro, TN
27 - 28 Dec:	Nolensville
28 Dec:	Triune
29 Dec:	Wilkinson's Cross Roads
29 Dec:	Lizzard's between Triune and Murfreesboro
30 Dec:	Overall's Creek
30 - 31 Dec 1862; 01 - 03 Jan 1863:	Battle of Stones River
05 Jan:	Lytle's Creek
21 - 22 Jan:	Reconnaissance to Auburn, Liberty and Cainsville
31 Jan - 13 Feb:	Expedition to Franklin
31 Jan:	Unionville, Middletown and Rover
13 Feb:	Rover
22 Mar:	Near Murfreesboro
22 Mar - 02 Apr:	Operations against Pegram
24 Mar:	Danville
10 Apr:	Engagement at Franklin
20 - 30 Apr:	Expedition to McMinnville
21 Apr:	McMinnville
21 Apr:	Hickory Creek
22 Apr:	Slatersville
23 Apr:	Alexandria
29 Apr; 03 Jun:	Wartrace
09 - 11 Jun:	Triune
23 Jun - 07 Jul:	Tullahoma Campaign
23 Jun:	Eaglesville and Rover
24 Jun:	Middleton
27 Jun:	Fosterville, Guy's Gap and Shelbyville
01 - 02 Jul:	Bethpage Bridge, Elk River
10 Jul:	Cooke County
13 - 11 Jul:	Expedition to Huntsville, AL
09 Aug:	Sparta
16 Aug - 02 Sep:	Crossing Cumberland Mountains and Tennessee River and Chickamauga Campaign
30 - 31 Aug:	Reconnaissance from Shellmound toward Chattanooga
31 Aug:	Will's Valley
09 Sep:	Winston's Gap, Alpine
12 Sep:	Alpine and Dirt Town
13 Sep:	Reconnaissance toward Lafayette
18 Sep:	Stevens' Gap
19 -21 Sep:	Battle of Chickamauga
21 Sep:	Dry Valley
30 Sep - 17 Oct:	Operations against Wheeler and Roddy
02 Oct:	Anderson's Cross Roads
13 - 14 Oct:	Fayetteville
to Dec:	Duty on Nashville & Chattanooga Railroad
24 - 28:	Operations about Dandridge and Mossy Creek
28 Dec 1863 - 04 Jan 1864:	Expedition to Memphis, TN
14 Jan:	moved to Colliersville, TN
12 Jan 1864:	Skirmish near Mossy Creek, TN (detachment)
11 - 26 Feb:	Smith's Expedition to Okolona, Miss.
18 Feb:	Near Okolona
19 Feb:	Houston
20 - 21 Feb:	West Point
21 Feb:	Prairie Station
22 Feb:	Okolona
22 Feb:	Tallahatchie River
27 Feb:	Ordered to Nashville, TN
to Jun:	Duty in Nashville, TN
to Nov:	Duty on line of Nashville & Chattanooga Railroad, and in District of North Alabama.
24 Jun - 20 Aug:	Operations in District of North Alabama
29 Jun:	Pond Springs, AL
Aug - Sep:	Operations against Wheeler
17 Aug:	Expedition from Decatur to Moulton
18 - 19 Aug:	Near Antioch Church
19 Aug:	Courtland and near Pond Springs
08 - 11 Sep:	Pursuit of Wheeler to Shoal Creek
16 Sep - 03 Nov:	Operations against Forrest and Hood
01 - 02 Oct:	Athens
26 - 29 Oct:	Defense of Decatur
Nov - Dec:	Nashville Campaign
01 Dec:	Owens' Cross Roads
07 Dec:	Near Paint Rock Bridge
15 - 16 Dec:	Battle of Nashville
17 - 28 Dec:	Pursuit of Hood to the Tennessee River
17 Dec:	Hollow Tree Gap, Franklin and West Harpeth River
19 Dec:	Rutherford Creek
23 Dec:	Lynnville
25 Dec:	Anthony's Hill near Pulaski
25 - 26 Dec:	Sugar Creek
27 - 28 Dec:	Near Decatur
29 Dec:	Pond Springs and Hillsboro
30 Dec:	Near Leighton
31 Dec:	Russellville
to 06 Feb 1865:	Duty at Gravelly Springs, AL
06 Feb - 10 Mar:	Moved to Vicksburg, Miss. then New Orleans, LA
to May 27:	Return to Vicksburg, Miss. for duty there and at various points in the Dept. of Mississippi.
12 Jun	Reported for duty in Nashville, TN after being ordered there.

== Casualties ==
The regiment lost a total of 224 men during service; 2 officers and 14 enlisted men killed or mortally wounded, 208 enlisted men died of disease or accident.

== Commanders ==
- Colonel Daniel M. Ray
- Lieutenant Colonel William R. Cook - commanded at the battles of Chickamauga and Nashville

== See also ==
- List of Tennessee Civil War units
- Tennessee in the Civil War
