= Caton (surname) =

Caton is the surname of the following people:

== Academics ==
- Gertrude Caton-Thompson (1888–1985), English archaeologist
- Hiram Caton (1936–2010), Australian academic
- Richard Caton (1842–1926), English scientist

== Performers ==
- Lauderic Caton (1910–1999), Trinidadian guitarist
- Michael Caton (born 1943), Australian television, film and stage actor
- Miles Caton (born 2005), American actor and musician
- Nathan Caton (born 1984), English comedian
- Roy Caton, trumpet player
- Steve Caton, American musician

== Politics and law ==
- Carolyn Caton, American politician from Missouri
- Homer Caton (1887–1958), Illinois politician and farmer
- John D. Caton (1812–1895), chief justice of the Illinois Supreme Court
- Martin Caton (born 1951), Welsh politician

== Sportspeople ==
- Andrew Caton (born 1987), English footballer
- Bill Caton (1924–2011), English footballer
- Dylan Caton (born 1995), Australian footballer
- Eugene Caton (1889–1979), American college football player and coach
- Howdy Caton (1894–1948), American professional baseball player
- James Caton (born 1994), English footballer
- Kevin Caton (born 1965), retired Australian rules footballer
- Larry Caton (1948–2025), American handball player
- Noah Caton (1897–1922), American football player
- Tommy Caton (1962–1993), English footballer
- Will Caton (1875–1943), American harness racing driver and trainer

== Others ==
- David Caton (born 1956), American political activist and writer
- Florence Missouri Caton (1875–1917), British nurse who served in Serbia during World War I
- Greg Caton (1956–2021), American businessman, inventor, manufacturer and promoter of herbal products
- Michael Caton-Jones (born 1957), Scottish film director
- Reginald Caton (1897–1971), British publisher
- Shaun Caton, British performance artist
- William Caton (1636–1665), English Quaker itinerant preacher and writer
