= Mount Kephart =

Mountain in United States of America

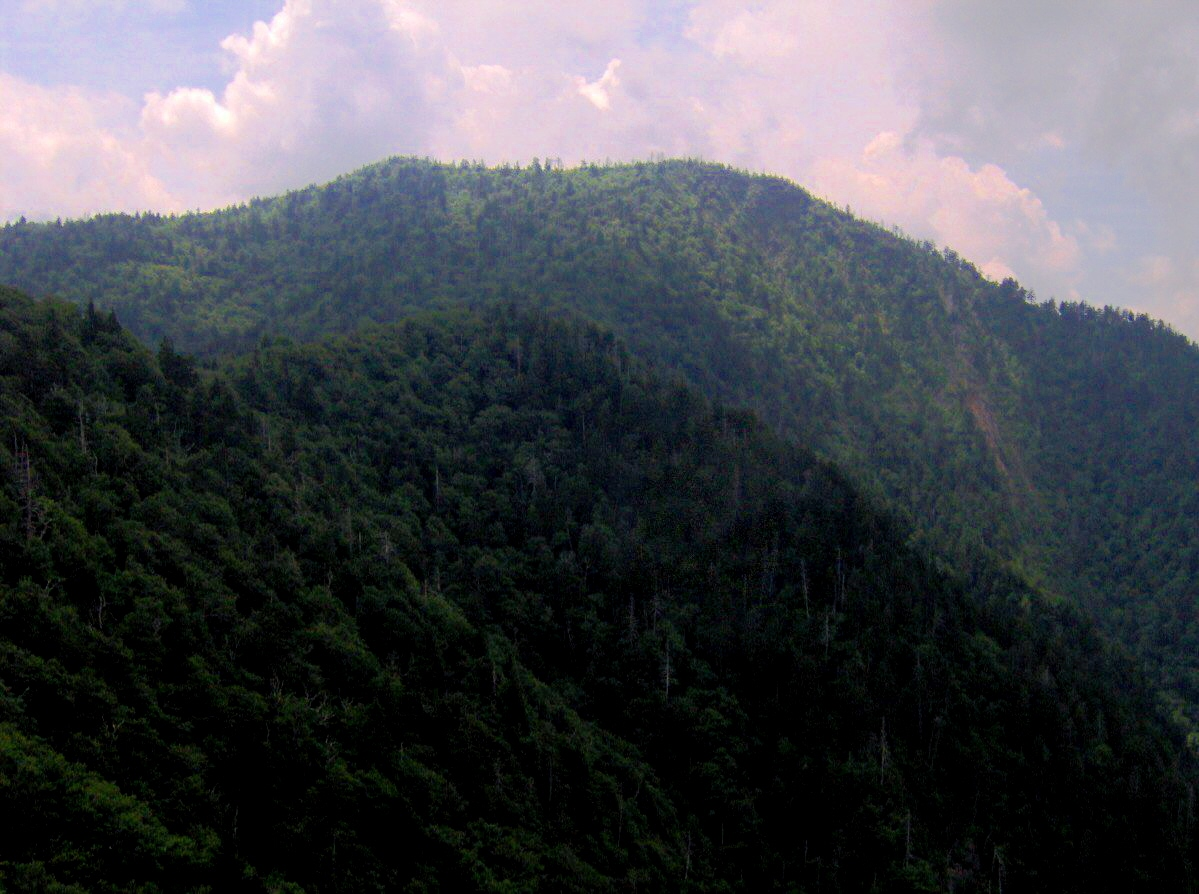
- Mt. Kephart, looking west from Charlies Bunion

Highest point
- Elevation: 6,217 ft (1,895 m)
- Prominence: 660 ft (200 m)
- Coordinates: 35°37′52″N 83°23′24″W

Geography
- Location: Sevier County, Tennessee / Swain County, North Carolina, U.S.
- Parent range: Great Smoky Mountains
- Topo map: USGS Mount Le Conte

Climbing
- Easiest route: Appalachian Trail + Boulevard Trail + Jumpoff Trail

Mount Kephart is a mountain in the central Great Smoky Mountains, located in the Southeastern United States. The Appalachian Trail crosses the mountain's south slope, making it a destination for thru-hikers. The Jumpoff, a 1,000-foot (300 m) cliff on the northeast side of the mountain, has views of the central and eastern Smokies. A stand of Southern Appalachian spruce-fir forest coats the mountain's upper elevations.

With an elevation of 6,217 ft, Mount Kephart is the 7th-highest mountain in Tennessee. Its topographic prominence is drastically reduced, however, by its close proximity to two higher neighbors, Kuwohi and Mount Le Conte.

Like much of the Smokies crests, Mount Kephart lies on the Tennessee-North Carolina border, in Sevier County, Tennessee and Swain County, North Carolina. The mountain rises nearly 4,000 feet (1,200 m) above its northern base at Porters Flat, and approximately 3,400 feet (1,000 m) above its southern base along the Oconaluftee River headwaters. Newfound Gap, at just over 5,000 feet (1,500 m), divides Mount Kephart from Fork Ridge (Mt. Collins) to the west. The gap is traversed by U.S. Highway 441, the only paved road crossing the Great Smoky Mountains National Park from north to south.

== Geology ==
Mount Kephart is composed of a type of slate and meta-siltstone known as Anakeesta Formation, which is common throughout the central Smokies. This type of rock is exposed at Charlies Bunion, just to the northeast of Kephart. The Anakeesta Formation rocks are part of the Ocoee Supergroup, formed from ocean sediments nearly a billion years ago. The mountain was formed 200 million years ago when the African and North American plates collided and thrust the rock upward during the Appalachian orogeny.

== History ==
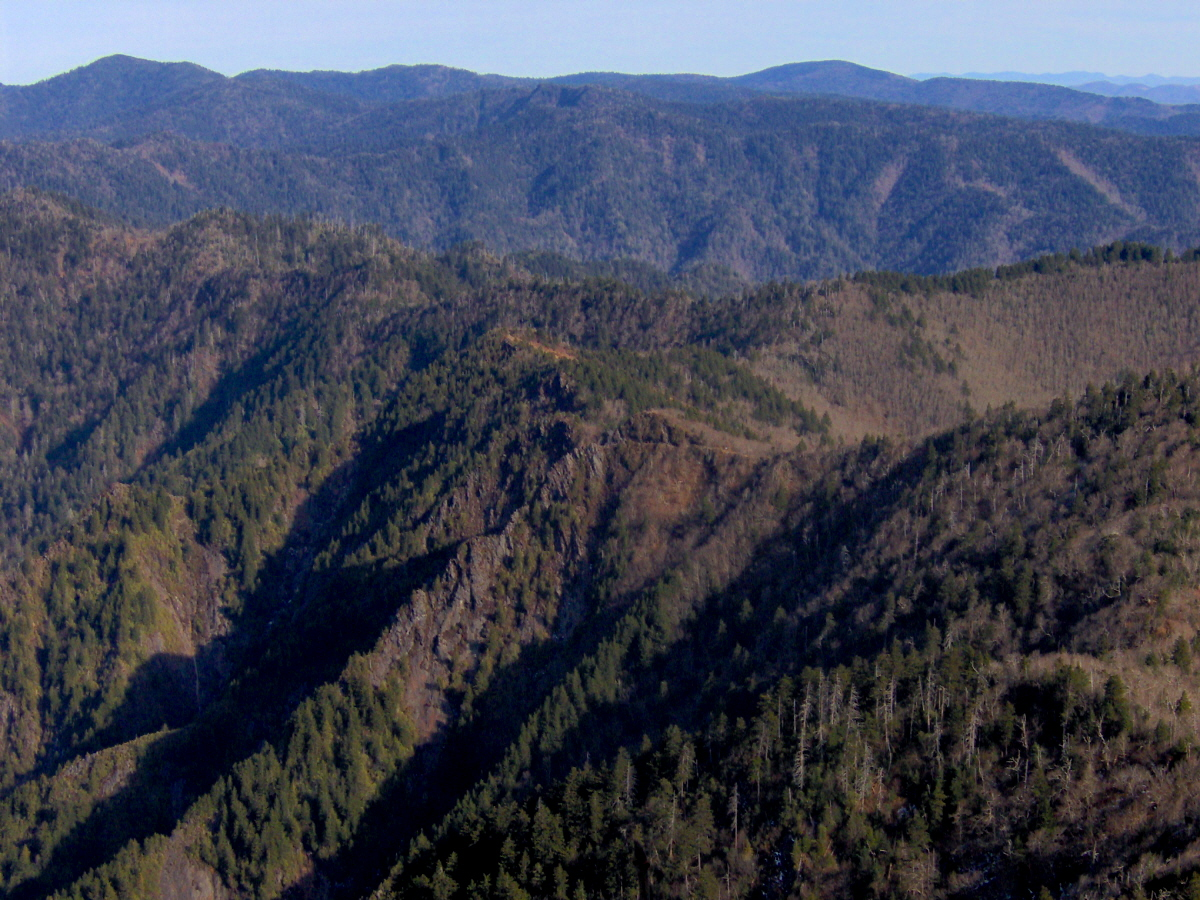
Jagged, V-shaped ridges comprise the aftermath of the violent billion-year history of the Smokies, looking east from The Jumpoff

Mount Kephart is named after Horace Kephart, an author and early proponent of establishing a national park in the Smokies. The mountain was called "Mount Collins" until the USGS gave it its current name in 1931, shifting the name "Mount Collins" to the peak between Kuwohi and Newfound Gap. Before the 1880s, Mount Kephart was known by various local names.

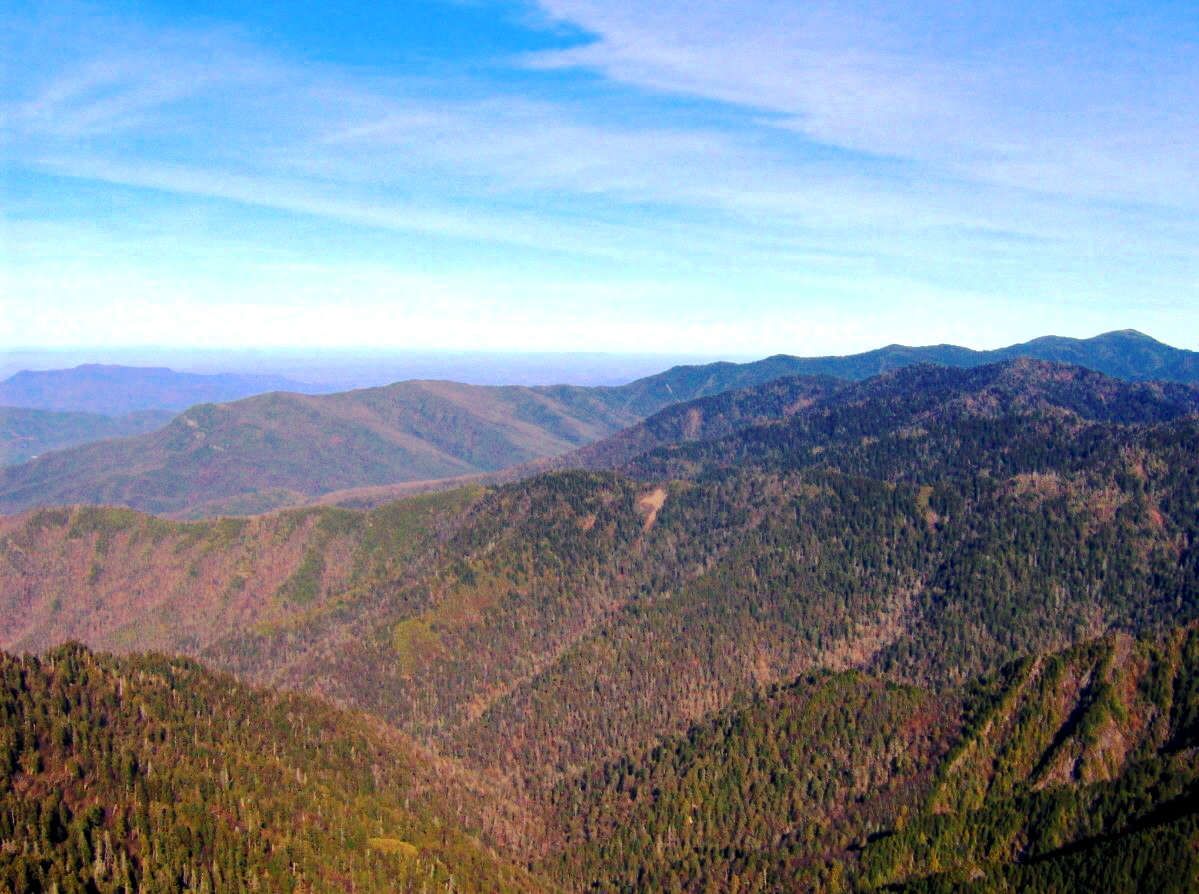
Looking northeast from The Jumpoff, with characteristic blue haze on the left

Mount Kephart was probably visited and measured by Arnold Guyot during his survey of the Smokies crest in the late 1850s. The name he used for the mountain, however, is uncertain. Guyot listed two mountains between Laurel Top and New (Newfound) Gap as having elevations greater than 6,000 feet (1,800 m) — Peck's Peak, which Guyot measured at 6,232 feet (1,900 m), and Mount Ocona, which Guyot measured at 6,135 feet (1,870 m). The former may refer to Peck's Corner, although Peck's Corner is not between Laurel Top and Newfound Gap, and Guyot would have missed its elevation by a staggering 1,300 feet (400 m). Other than Mount Kephart, the only peak between Laurel Top and Newfound Gap higher than 6,000 feet (1,800 m) is Mount Ambler, a knob on Kephart's southwest slope.

Laura Thornborough, a writer who made many excursions into the Smokies in the 1930s, recalled a stream now known as Icewater Spring, on Kephart's south slope:

Our party reached a good spring on the Carolina side of Mt. Kephart, about three miles (5 km) from our starting point. It had been freshly cleaned out and lined with native rock. The water was clear and icy cold."

A Civilian Conservation Corps camp operated on the mountain's southern base in the 1930s, the chimney of which remains near the head of the Kephart Prong Trail. During World War II, this camp was used to house conscientious objectors. Also in this area are the remains of a Works Progress Administration fish hatchery built in 1936.

== Access ==
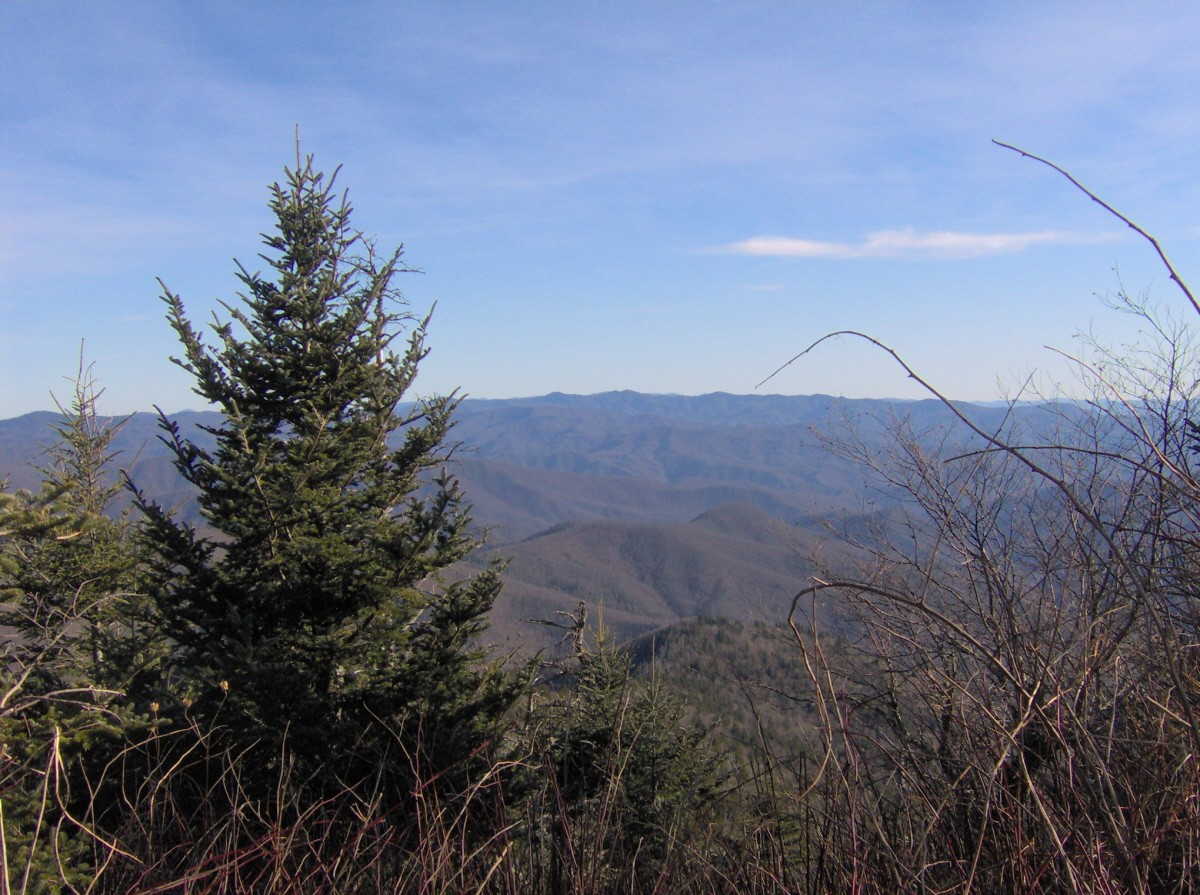
Looking southeast from the summit of Mt. Kephart

The Appalachian Trail crosses Mount Kephart's southern slope en route to the Sawteeth and the eastern Smokies. While the trail misses the summit by just over 200 feet (60 m), several clearings between Mount Ambler and Icewater Spring have views of the south-central Smokies and Kuwohi. There is a backcountry shelter at Icewater Spring for Appalachian Trail thru-hikers.

The Jumpoff Trail crosses the summit en route to the Jumpoff, a high cliff on the mountain's northern slope. The view from the Jumpoff is usually greater than 180 degrees, from Mount Le Conte to the northwest to the Balsam Mountains to the southeast. The Jumpoff Trail is just a few feet beyond the Appalachian Trail and The Boulevard Trail intersection, approximately three miles from Newfound Gap.

The Kephart Prong Trail ascends the mountain's south slope to the Kephart backcountry shelter. Its trailhead is on U.S. 441 between Newfound Gap and the Oconaluftee Valley. After two miles (3 km), the Kephart Prong Trail forks, one way following the Sweat Heifer Trail to Kephart's southwest slope (near Mt. Ambler), the other continuing on to Dry Sluice Gap (near Charlies Bunion).
