= Gatlinburg Arts and Crafts Community =

Coordinates: 35.7428°N 83.4571°W

The Gatlinburg Arts and Crafts Community, also known as the Great Smoky Arts and Crafts Community, is a series of shops and galleries along an 8-mile two-laned loop in Sevier County, Tennessee east of Gatlinburg. It is set in a traditional setting of rural Appalachia, away from the town's activity, where artisans create their crafts and sell them.

A portion of the community is located along Tennessee State Route 454.
