= Oldham, Tennessee =

Rural community in Tennessee, US

Coordinates: 35.7762033°N 83.4821078°W

Oldham is a rural community in Sevier County, Tennessee. Alternative names for the area are Oldham's Creek and Boogertown.

The community was named for Stephen Oldham, a pioneer settler.
