= Tennessee State Route 416 =

State Highway in Tennessee

State Route 416
- Pittman Center Road
- TN 416 highlighted in red

Route information
- Maintained by TDOT
- Length: 14.5 mi (23.3 km)

Major junctions
- South end: US 321 at Pittman Center
- North end: US 411 at Sevierville

Location
- Country: United States
- State: Tennessee
- Counties: Sevier

Highway system
- Tennessee State Routes; Interstate; US; State
← US 412	→ SR 417

State Route 416 (SR 416, also known locally as Pittman Center Road) is a secondary highway that runs south to north, entirely in Sevier County, Tennessee.

== Route description ==
SR 416 begins in Pittman Center at US 321 and it ends at US 411 in eastern Sevierville. It is a two-laned road that curves through hilly terrain and farmland, and it is commonly used as an alternate route to bypass peak time traffic in Sevierville and Pigeon Forge on US 441. Junctioning with SR 454, near the convergence of Upper Middle Creek Road and Birds Creek Road, it may be used to reach the Gatlinburg Arts and Crafts Community.

== Junction list ==
The entire route is in Sevier County.

Location	mi	km	Destinations	Notes
Pittman Center	0.00	0.00	US 321 (East Parkway/SR 73) – Gatlinburg, Cosby	Southern terminus
			SR 454 south (Birds Creek Road) – Gatlinburg Arts and Crafts Community	Northern terminus of SR 454
Sevierville			Old Newport Highway TO SR 339 – Newport, Cosby	
Sevierville			US 411 (Newport Highway/SR 35) – Sevierville, Newport	Northern terminus
1.000 mi = 1.609 km; 1.000 km = 0.621 mi

== See also ==
- List of Tennessee state highways
- Tennessee Department of Transportation
