= Richard "Preacher Dick" Evans =

Richard E. Evans (Jan. 4, 1824 - Dec. 6, 1901), also known as "Preacher Dick," or "Uncle Dickey," was a Baptist preacher who served in East Tennessee and western North Carolina. Evans was born in Sevier County, Tennessee, the only son of Jacob Evans of South Carolina and Martha Ogle of Tennessee. He died in Sevier County and his remains are interred in Sevier County's Forks of the River Cemetery.

== Preacher Dick ==
At 16, he was converted by reverends Eli Roberts and William Ogle and joined White Oak Flats Church. That same year, on Jan. 30 of 1840, Evans married Ollief (Olive) Ownby, then 13. The couple would have 12 children. At 20, Evans was licensed to preach by his home church, White Oaks Flat. At 22, he was ordained.

Evans had little formal education and was not a trained polemic or skilled debater. He preferred a more direct approach, a "running fire" teaching of the gospel. He is said to have converted more than 10,000 souls and to have baptized 1,800 converts by his own hand.

== "I fiddle for the Lord!" ==
Though Preacher Dick was a resident of East Tennessee, he preached for two years to the Cherokee Indians of Bird Town, North Carolina. He was also known to lead revivals in western North Carolina. On the way to one such revival, accompanied by Russell Ogle, a young man recently called to preach, he came upon a schoolhouse where a crowd had gathered for a dance. Darkness was near and the two were without shelter. Ogle was uncertain. The reverend should not be associated with such sin, he thought. "This is the place," Preacher Dick said. "We're going to stop here."

The two went inside and Preacher Dick made his way to the front of the crowd. The man in charge of the dance asked Preacher Dick if he played the fiddle. Preacher Dick replied he was "about the best there is." When it was Preacher Dick's turn to play, he reached into his saddlebag and took out two books — his Bible and his hymnal. "This is my fiddle," he said, holding the Bible aloft, "and this is my bow. But I fiddle for the Lord!"

"God, the man's a preacher!" a man in back yelled. Preacher Dick sang a hymn. The crowd slowly joined in the singing. Then Preacher Dick started preaching. He preached for nearly two hours. When he was finished, 10 people professed their faith in Jesus Christ.

== Churches Served ==
- White Oak Flats (home church)
- Ware's Cove
- Red Bank
- Bethany
- Friendship
- Hill's Creek
- New Salem
- Lebanon
- Evans' Chapel No. 1
- Evans' Chapel No. 2
- Tuckaleechee
- Lufty
- Shoal Creek
- Bird Town

== Resources ==
Burnett, J .J., Sketches of Tennessee's Pioneer Baptist Preachers

Lawson, Fred Raulston, The Lawsons of East Tennessee
