= Richardson Cove, Tennessee =

Unincorporated community in Sevier County, Tennessee, U.S.

Richardson Cove
- Unincorporated community
- Interactive map of Richardson Cove
- Coordinates: 35°48′57″N 83°26′01″W
- Country: United States
- State: Tennessee
- County: Sevier
- First settled: 1792
- Post office established: 1875
- Post office closed: 1901
- Founder: William Richardson

Richardson Cove is an unincorporated community in Sevier County, Tennessee, United States.

== History ==
The first settlement at Richardsons Cove was made in 1792 by William Richardson. A variant name was "Richisons Cove". A post office called Richison's Cove was established in 1875, the name was changed to Richison Cove in 1892, the name was changed again to Richison in 1895, and the post office closed in 1901. The community once contained a schoolhouse, the Richardson Cove School, now defunct.
