= Reagantown, Tennessee =

- Unincorporated community
- Location within Tennessee Location within the United States
- Coordinates: 35°50′27″N 83°30′39″W
- Country: United States
- State: Tennessee
- County: Sevier
- Elevation: 1,142 ft (348 m)
- Time zone: UTC-5 (Eastern (EST))
  - Summer (DST): UTC-4 (EDT)
- Area code: 865
- GNIS feature ID: 1647679

Reagantown is an unincorporated community in Sevier County, Tennessee, United States.
