= Fairgarden, Tennessee =

- Census-designated place
- Location within Tennessee Location within the United States
- Coordinates: 35°53′54″N 83°24′43″W
- Country: United States
- State: Tennessee
- County: Sevier

Area
  - Total: 1.73 sq mi (4.48 km^{2})
  - Land: 1.73 sq mi (4.48 km^{2})
  - Water: 0 sq mi (0.00 km^{2})
- Elevation: 1,184 ft (361 m)

Population (2020)
  - Total: 481
  - Density: 277.8/sq mi (107.27/km^{2})
- Time zone: UTC-5 (Eastern (EST))
  - Summer (DST): UTC-4 (EDT)
- ZIP code: 37876
- Area code: 865
- GNIS feature ID: 2584578

Fairgarden is a census-designated place in Sevier County, Tennessee, United States. Its population was 529 as of the 2010 census.

== Demographics ==
Historical population
Census	Pop.	Note	%±
2010	529		—
2020	481		−9.1%
U.S. Decennial Census

=== Racial and ethnic composition ===
Fairgarden CDP, Tennessee – Racial and ethnic composition Note: the US Census treats Hispanic/Latino as an ethnic category. This table excludes Latinos from the racial categories and assigns them to a separate category. Hispanics/Latinos may be of any race.
Race / Ethnicity (NH = Non-Hispanic)	Pop 2010	Pop 2020	% 2010	% 2020
White alone (NH)	510	441	96.41%	91.68%
Black or African American alone (NH)	0	3	0.00%	0.62%
Native American or Alaska Native alone (NH)	1	7	0.19%	1.46%
Asian alone (NH)	3	3	0.57%	0.62%
Native Hawaiian or Pacific Islander alone (NH)	0	0	0.00%	0.00%
Other race alone (NH)	0	3	0.00%	0.62%
Mixed race or Multiracial (NH)	9	8	1.70%	1.66%
Hispanic or Latino (any race)	6	16	1.13%	3.33%
Total	529	481	100.00%	100.00%

=== 2020 census ===
As of the 2020 United States census, there were 481 people, 186 households, and 153 families residing in the CDP.
