= Foxfire Mountain Themed Adventure Park =

Park in Sevierville, Tennessee, United States

Coordinates: 35.830°N 83.392°W

Foxfire Mountain is in Sevierville, Tennessee, United States in the foothills of the Great Smoky Mountains National Park. Foxfire Mountain occupies an area known as Pearl Valley near Dunne's Creek. The area known as Foxfire Mountain is a 150-acre parcel of land that is rich in history.

== History ==
One of the many stories about Foxfire Mountain is how the mountain got its name. According to local lore, In the days before park rangers patrolled the Great Smoky Mountains National Park, local settlers had to protect the natural beauty of the land by regulating the growth of under-brush. Dead undergrowth that amasses over the years is a potential forest fire hazard. To prevent such calamities settlers had controlled burns by burning off the under-brush in a confined area. Early settlers had an ingenious method to burn off the unwanted undergrowth. They would capture a fox and tie a rag to his tail which had been soaked in oil which was an expensive commodity in those early years. Settlers were thrifty in their use of oil. They would set the rag on fire and the frightened fox would run around frantically dragging the flaming rag behind him setting the undergrowth on fire as he ran along. Eventually he would ignite the undergrowth that needed to be burned off and the string that attached the fox to the rag would burn off. The Fox would then scurry away and the settlers would tend t the burning undergrowth.; Foxfire Mountain was originally inhabited by the Cherokee. Artifacts, such as arrow heads, found in the area date back 10,000 years. The Cherokee planted corn on the mountain and hunted bear, deer, turkey and turtles. The creation of ironworks in East Tennessee in 1809 paved the way for mining in Sevier County. Iron was discovered on Foxfire Mountain in 1820. With the help of the Cherokee the iron was mined and the Native American workers were paid with the silver byproduct of the mining operation. The Cherokee miners usually hid their silver in the mine for safe keeping. In 1838, the Cherokee were forced to relocate to Oklahoma is what is known as "the Trail of Tears." The Cherokee were forced out of East Tennessee and Foxfire Mountain. many never recovered the silver they had stashed in the mine. After the departure of the Cherokee, Isaac Love and his sons created a partnership with the Shields Iron Co. to continue mining at Foxfire Mountain.;

In the 1860s, during the Civil War, the Confederate Army had a camp at the bend in the river near the base of Foxfire Mountain. The natural resources in the area and access to iron, sulfur and saltpetre made Foxfire Mountain strategic to the creation of much needed war materials. As the war encroached into Tennessee, Union soldiers were reported in the area near Foxfire. One afternoon a local man, William Thomas, was killed near his home by a Union soldier. They reportedly believed Thomas was a Confederate sympathizer providing food and supplies to Southern forces. In reality, he was a moonshiner hauling ingredients for his liquor to his still which was hidden in the crevices of the old iron mine.

In the late 1800s the property was purchased by Judge Benjamin Owens who was known locally as the hanging judge. Owens was rumored to have hanged criminals from an oak tree in Richardson's Cove Road along Dunn Creek. The cemetery where Owens is buried, along with his son and 20 unnamed others is being preserved by the current owners of the property. Owens' picture hangs in the Sevier County Courthouse.

In 1902, Wilson and Eva Thomas, descendants of William Thomas, acquired the property for farming as small iron mines were unprofitable and new mining technology favored larger mines. One afternoon, Wilson was hiking with his daughter around the abandoned mine when the young girl fell in. Although her injuries were minor, Wilson decided to destroy the mine by blasting it with dynamite causing it to collapse, thus forever burying the silver that had been hidden there by the Cherokee decades earlier. For seven generations the Thomas family farmed and operated a blacksmith shop at Foxfire Mountain.

In 1998, Marc and Marion Postlewaite bought the Foxfire Farm from Earl Thomas to raise Hereford cattle. Their Herefords were sold as breeding stock to other ranchers who wanted to improve their gene pool. In 2007, the southeast was gripped by the worst drought since 1946, with feed prices escalating to unprecedented proportions, the Postlewaites sold the cattle and made the decision to sell the land. Then, in a serendipitous turn of events, the Postlewaites went on vacation in Alaska where Marc went zip lining for the first time in his life.

After the zip line adventure Postlewaite returned to Foxfire Mountain where he took his farm off the market and decided to open an adventure park.

== Facilities ==
Today Foxfire Mountain is a 150 acres (61 ha) adventure park that features two zip line courses including the highest zip line in the south. This particular zip line, known as "Goliath" hangs 475 feet above the ground. The property has a 60-foot climbing wall, which is the highest in Tennessee, a rope obstacle course, a free fall, bear crawler tours, hiking trails and the longest suspension bridge in the United States. Foxfire Mountain was featured in a book entitled "The History of Eastern Sevier County" that was published by Arcadia Books on June 29, 2015. Several pictures of the park's construction as well as the history of the mountain was discussed in the book. The book was written by local journalist Michael Williams.
