= Charlies Bunion =

Mountain in the eastern United States

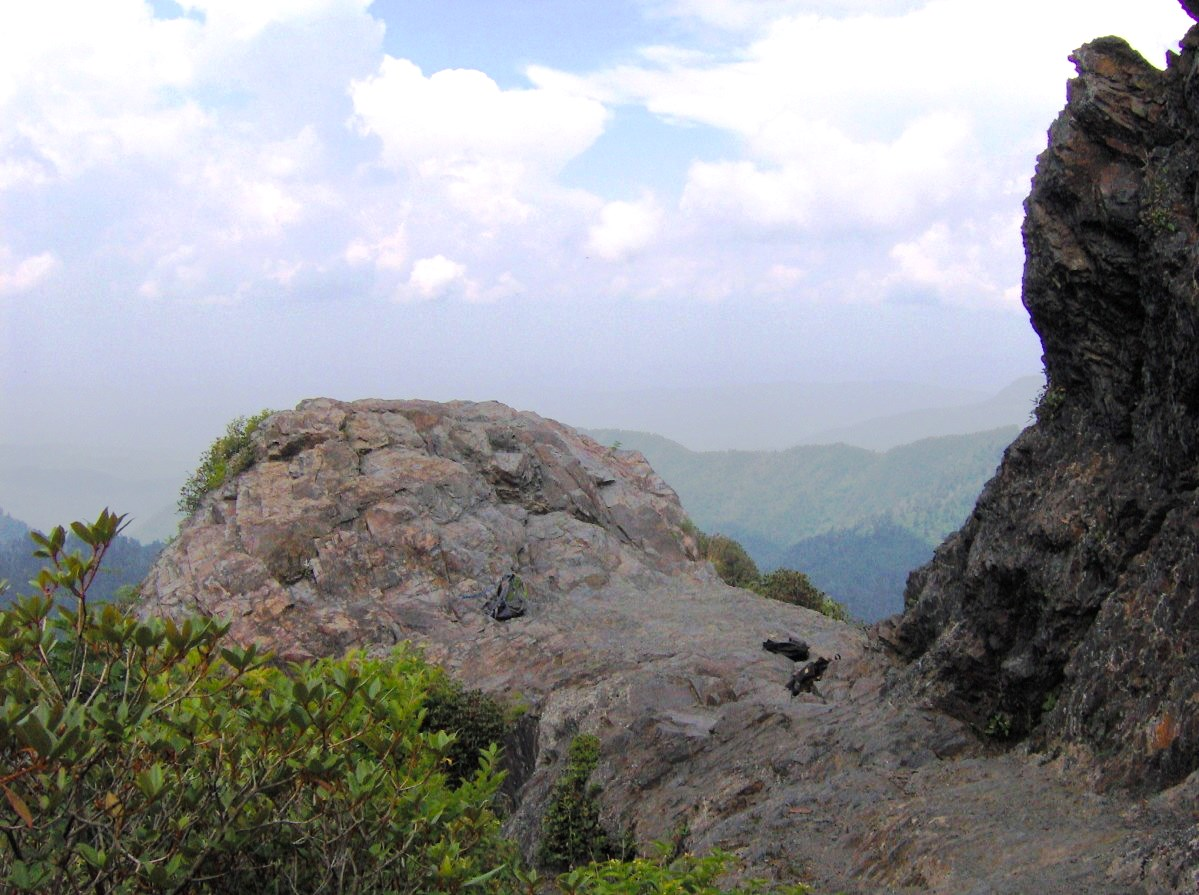
- The characteristic boulder-like protrusion on northern face of Charlies Bunion, with the summit rising on the right

Highest point
- Elevation: 5,528 ft (1,685 m)
- Prominence: 140 feet (43 m)
- Coordinates: 35°38′21.26″N 83°22′18.43″W

Geography
- Location within Tennessee Location within the United States
- Location: Sevier County, Tennessee, U.S.; Swain County, North Carolina, U.S.; Great Smoky Mountains NP
- Parent range: Great Smoky Mountains
- Topo map: USGS Mount Guyot

Climbing
- Easiest route: Appalachian Trail from Newfound Gap

Charlies Bunion is a mountain in the Great Smoky Mountains of the Southeastern United States, characterized by a large boulder-like protrusion just below the summit on its otherwise-sheer northern face. The mountain is a rare instance of a bare-rock summit in the Smokies.

Charlies Bunion rises to an elevation of 5,528 feet (1,685 m) above sea level, and is situated along the state line between Sevier County, Tennessee and Swain County, North Carolina. The Appalachian Trail crosses the mountain's northern slope some four miles (6 km) east of Newfound Gap, allowing day-hikers and rock climbers easy access.

== Geology ==
Charlies Bunion comprises the western wing of The Sawteeth, a series of narrow, jagged cliffs connecting the high peaks of the Central Smokies with the high peaks of the Eastern Smokies. These cliffs are underlain by a Precambrian metamorphic rock of the Ocoee Supergroup known as "Anakeesta Formation," which consists mainly of slate. The Anakeesta Formation, which comprises much of the crest of the Central Smokies, was created nearly a billion years ago from ancient ocean sediments. The rock was thrust upward during the Appalachian orogeny, when the North American and African plates collided around 400 million years ago.

The steep northern face of Charlies Bunion is drained by the headwaters of the Middle Fork of the Little Pigeon River, and loses 2,000 feet (609 m) in elevation in just over a mile. The southern face, which is more gradual, is drained by the headwaters of the Oconaluftee River, specifically Kephart Prong and Bradley Fork.

== History ==
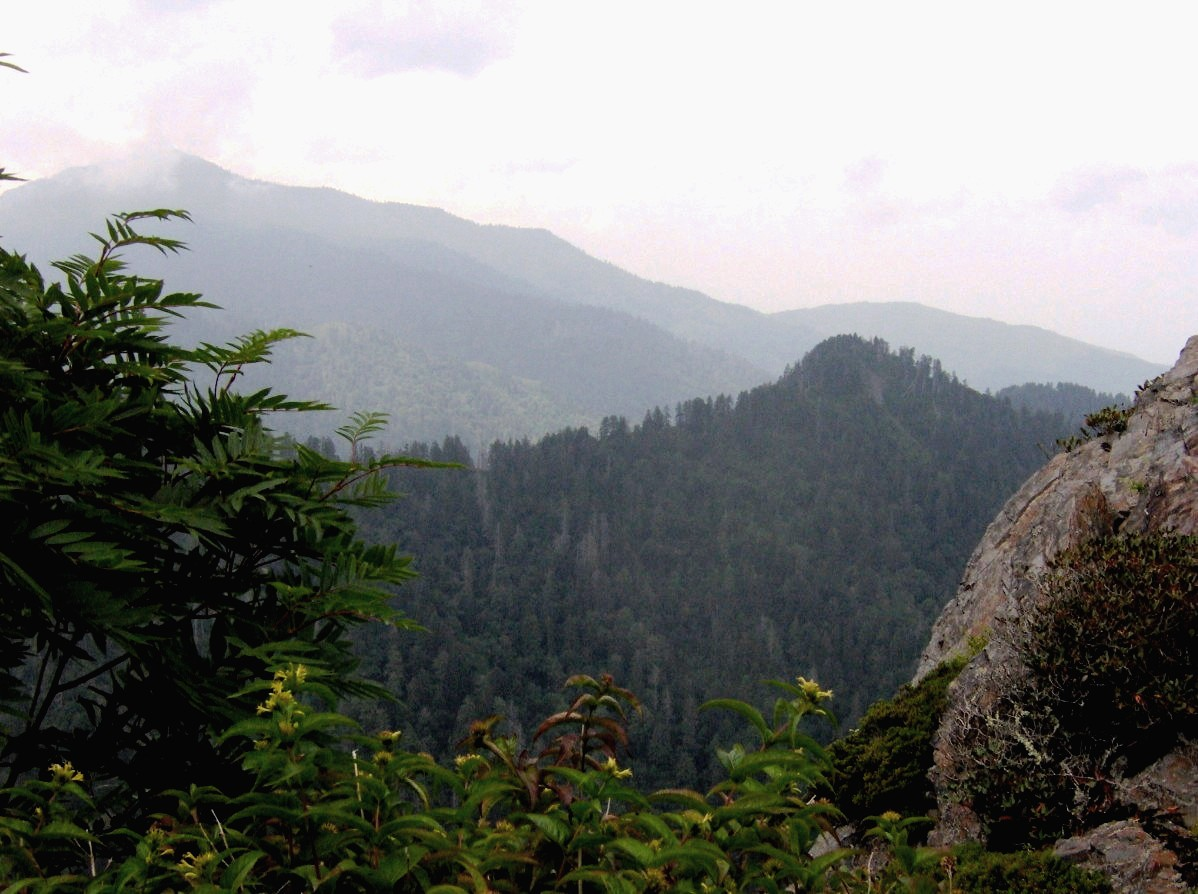
The view looking northwest from Charlies Bunion, with Mount Le Conte rising on the left

Other than the occasional surveyor or naturalist, few people ventured to the Sawteeth before the 1900s. This area of the Smokies was part of a 40-mile (64 km) stretch of wilderness described by Horace Kephart as "so rough that you could not make seven miles a day in it to save your life..."

While the main route across the crest of the Smokies was the old Indian Gap Trail (now U.S. Route 441), which crested between Newfound Gap and Kuwohi, an alternative route was to ascend Kephart Prong to Dry Sluice Gap, on the eastern flank of Charlies Bunion, and descend into the Porters Creek Valley. The Whaley brothers, William and Middleton, used this route around 1800 while traveling from Oconaluftee to what is now Greenbrier.

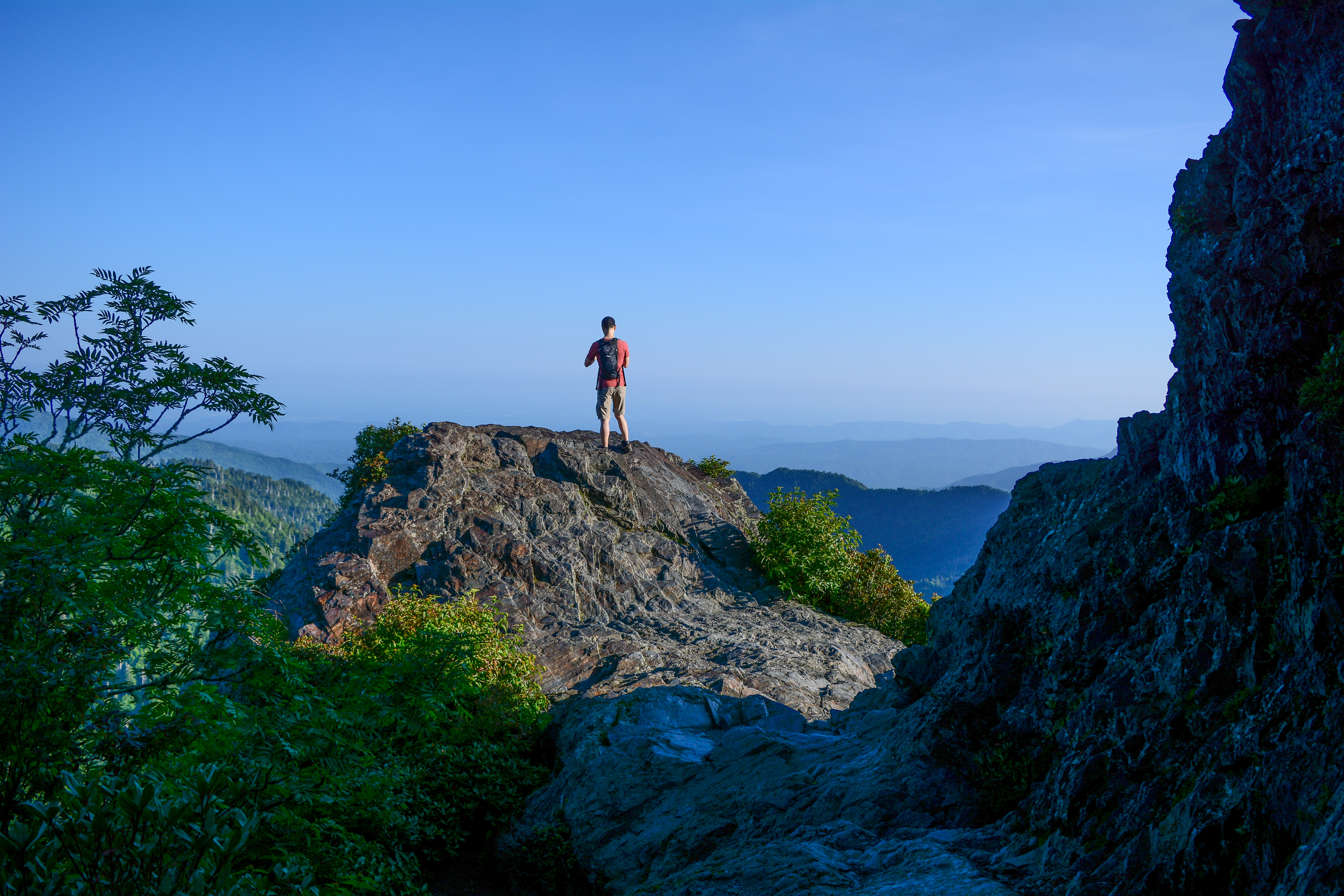
A hiker atop Charlies Bunion; a view of the Great Smoky Mountains can be seen from here

Charlies Bunion, like most of the central crest of the Smokies, was fairly heavily forested until the 20th century. Large-scale logging operations in the Oconaluftee valley, however, left large piles of dry, dead brushwood scattered about the streambeds above Smokemont. In 1925, a massive forest fire, feeding off this dry foliage, raced up Kephart Prong, and quickly spread across the Sawteeth and over into Tennessee. The heat from the fire was so intense, it not only scorched every plant in its path, but it rendered the soil sterile. Then in 1929, a cloudburst dumped torrential rains on the Smokies, washing away the scalded soil from the western flank of the Sawteeth and giving it its current rocky appearance.

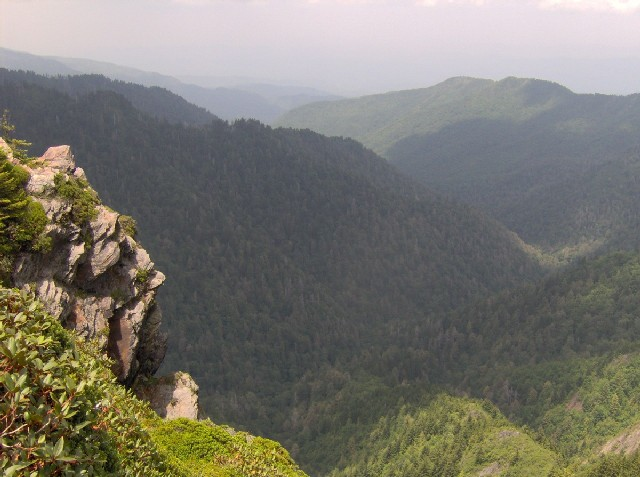
The view looking northeast from Charlies Bunion, with the Porters Creek Valley below

A few days after the 1929 cloudburst, a group of mountaineers led by Horace Kephart climbed to the crest of the Central Smokies to inspect the damage. When they reached the now-barren western flank of the Sawteeth, Charlie Conner, a mountain guide from Oconaluftee, removed his shoe, revealing a badly-swollen foot. Upon seeing this, Kephart was said to have remarked, "I'm going to get this put on a Government map for you." There is another, slightly different, story told by Paul M. Fink in his book "The Names and Lore of The Great Smoky Mountains" in which Fink says that one of the group upon looking at the bare rock pinnacle left by the storm, and knowing of Conner's foot affliction, remarked: "Well that sticks out like Charlie's bunion" prompting Kephart to decide on that name. The United States Geological Survey gave it the name "Charlie's Bunion" shortly thereafter. The mountain rising above Charlies Bunion to the west was named after Kephart himself.

In 1935, the Civilian Conservation Corps constructed a leg of the Appalachian Trail across the northern face of Charlies Bunion for the Great Smoky Mountains National Park, which had officially opened the previous year. Today, the mountain's summit and characteristic boulder-like protrusion offer great views of Tennessee and the other peaks of the main ridge in the Smokies, especially Mount Le Conte and Mount Kephart.
