= Shaun Caton =

British performance artist and painter

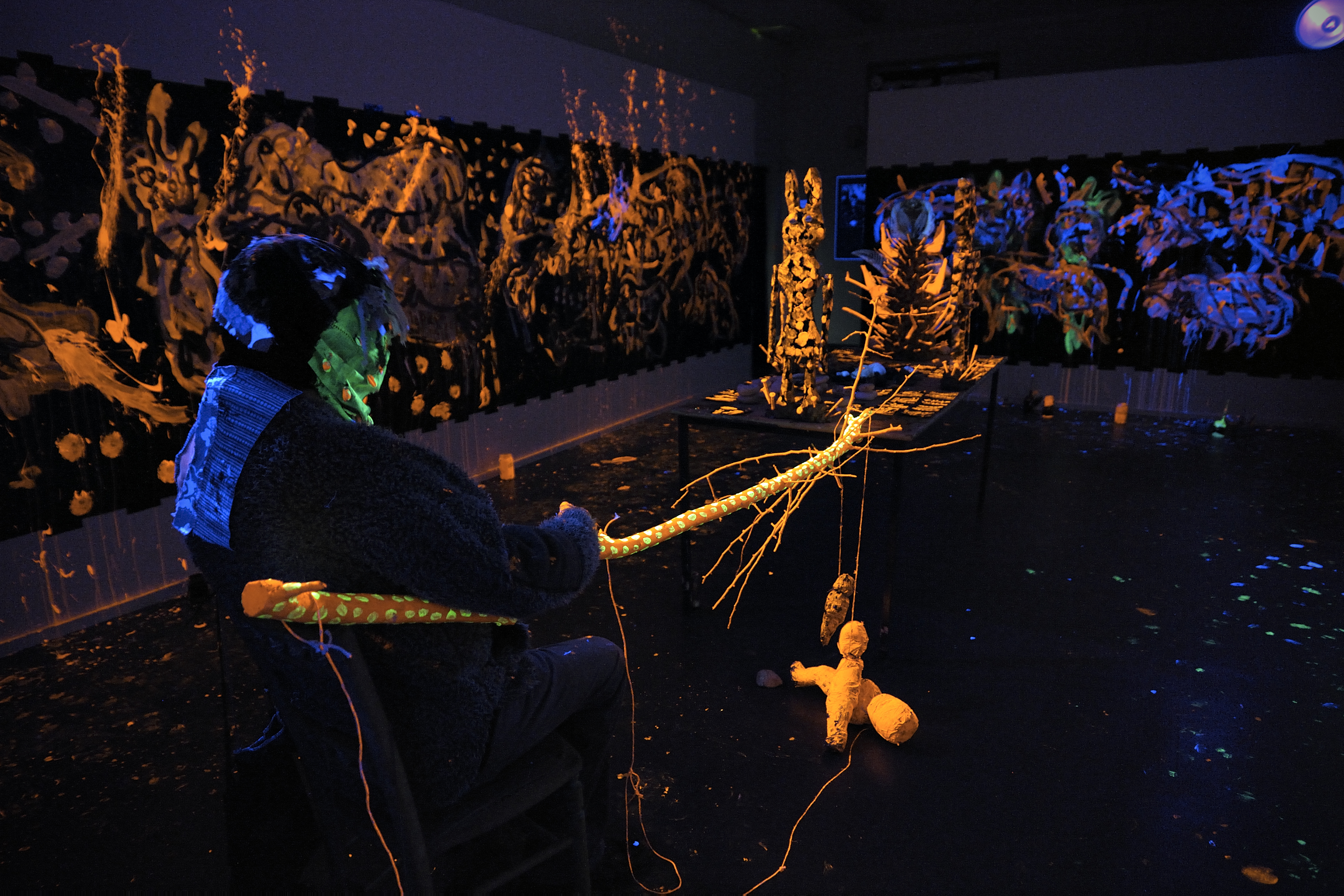
Shaun Caton, 2011

Shaun Caton is a British performance artist and painter, who has created over 280 live performances worldwide since the early 1980s. Often characterised by extreme duration (some performances have lasted 3 weeks) or brevity (some performances just 17 minutes), his works incorporate the installation of ancient and organic items, with the making of gigantic paintings, often illuminated by ultraviolet lighting. These works strongly reflect prehistoric or apocalyptic imagery.

Caton's work evolved through the 1980s gradually forming the ritualistic hallmark that he has come to be recognised and associated with. His work is deeply informed by a study of Ice Age cave art and portable art, and in 2007/2008 he visited many of the painted caves in the Dordogne region of France. Caton studied at Winchester School of Art and Goldsmith's London, and became interest in experimenting with living art and the human body. His work is emotional and operates on many levels employing specially created soundtracks (composed in collaboration with sound artists brownsierra), altered lighting conditions, use of shadow play with puppetry, live action and sculptural installation.

He has also used smell as an intrinsic aspect of his performances to evoke a primordial atmosphere. The performances shares an affinity with the activities and cosmological work of shamans, the complex symbolism of alchemy, and a knowledge of prehistoric art. In many ways, it is evocative of the concept of the wunderkammer or the 17th century Cabinet of Curiosities – it frequently uses paradox. A typical performance may last up to 7 hours, during which time Caton creates hundreds of automatic drawings, which are often obliterated and turned into new images.

Caton has amassed a considerable array of props that he animates in his performances, such as: huge stuffed fish heads, petrified tree fungi, lead and pewter medieval toys/pilgrim's badges, ceramic shards, fossils, bones, masks, ancient dolls, Victorian photographs. His performances are recognisable by their obsessive use of multi-layering and vivid colours – whereas, his paintings are often in a muted palette of browns, blues, greys and blacks. Recently he made hundreds of minuscule drawings that could only be viewed with a magnifying lens in ultraviolet light.

== Prizes and awards ==
- The British Council 1989, 1991 and 1994
- The Jacob Mendelson Scholarship Trust, 1990
- The Outsider Archive, 1990
- The Arts Council of Great Britain 1988 and 1994
- The Penny Trust 2000
- The Daguerreian Society USA, 2004
- The British Council 2012
