= Tennessee State Route 454 =

State highway in Tennessee, United States

State Route 454
- TN 454 highlighted in red

Route information
- Maintained by TDOT
- Length: 6.2 mi (10.0 km)

Major junctions
- South end: US 321 along the Gatlinburg–Pittman Center city line
- North end: SR 416 near Sevierville

Location
- Country: United States
- State: Tennessee
- Counties: Sevier

Highway system
- Tennessee State Routes; Interstate; US; State
← SR 452	→ SR 455

State Route 454 (SR 454) is a state highway in Sevier County, Tennessee. It serves as bypass of Sevierville and Pigeon Forge and a route to the Gatlinburg Arts and Crafts Community.

== Route description ==
SR 454 begins on the border on the city of Gatlinburg and the town of Pittman Center at an intersection with US 321/SR 73. It goes north as Buckhorn Road through hilly terrain and is very curvy. At an intersection with Glades Road, SR 454 becomes Birds Creek Road and follows closely to Bird Creek. It then comes to an end at SR 416 northeast of Gatlinburg, northwest of Pittman Center and east of Pigeon Forge.

== Junction list ==
The entire route is in Sevier County.

Location	mi	km	Destinations	Notes
Gatlinburg–Pittman Center line	0.0	0.0	US 321 (East Parkway/SR 73) – Gatlinburg, Cosby	Southern terminus
Gatlinburg			Glades Road – Gatlinburg Arts and Crafts Community	
			SR 416 (Pittman Center Road) – Sevierville, Pittman Center	Northern terminus
1.000 mi = 1.609 km; 1.000 km = 0.621 mi
