= Sevier County, Tennessee =

County in Tennessee, United States

- County
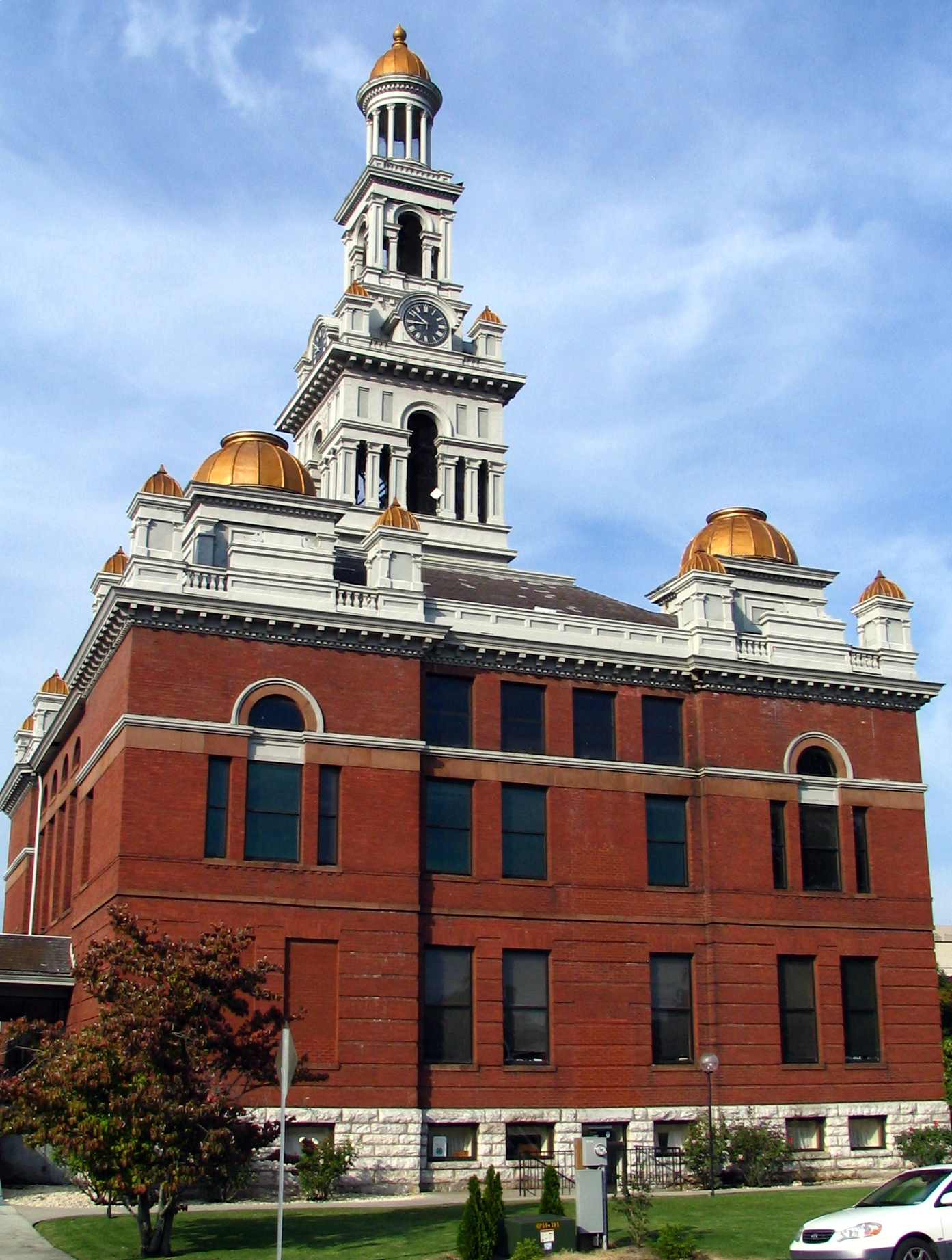
- Sevier County Courthouse in Sevierville

- Flag Seal Logo

- Location within the U.S. state of Tennessee
- Coordinates: 35°47′N 83°31′W
- Country: United States
- State: Tennessee
- Founded: September 27, 1794
- Named for: John Sevier
- Seat: Sevierville
- Largest city: Sevierville

Area
  - Total: 598 sq mi (1,550 km^{2})
  - Land: 593 sq mi (1,540 km^{2})
  - Water: 5.2 sq mi (13 km^{2}) 0.9%

Population (2020)
  - Total: 98,380
  - Estimate (2025): 101,342 ▲
  - Density: 166/sq mi (64.1/km^{2})
- Time zone: UTC−5 (Eastern)
  - Summer (DST): UTC−4 (EDT)
- Congressional district: 1st
- Website: www.seviercountytn.gov

Sevier County (/səˈvɪər/ sə-VEER) is a county of the U.S. state of Tennessee. As of the 2020 census, the population was 98,380. Its county seat and largest city is Sevierville. Sevier County comprises the Sevierville, TN Micropolitan Statistical Area, which is included in the Knoxville–Morristown–Sevierville, TN Combined Statistical Area.

== History ==
Prior to the arrival of white settlers in present-day Sevier County in the mid-18th century, the area had been inhabited for as many as 20,000 years by nomadic and semi-nomadic Native Americans. In the mid-16th century, Spanish expeditions led by Hernando de Soto (1540) and Juan Pardo (1567) passed through what is now Sevier County, reporting that the region was part of the domain of Chiaha, a minor Muskogean chiefdom centered around a village located on a now-submerged island just upstream from modern Douglas Dam. By the late 17th-century, however, the Cherokee, whose ancestors were living in the mountains at the time of the Spaniards' visit, had become the dominant tribe in the region. Although they used the region primarily as hunting grounds, the Chicakamauga faction of the Cherokee vehemently fought white settlement in their territory, frequently leading raids on households, even through the signing of various peace treaties, alternating short periods of peace with violent hostility, until forcibly marched from their territory by the U.S. government on the "Trail of Tears".

Sevier County was formed on September 18, 1794, from part of neighboring Jefferson County, and has retained its original boundaries ever since. The county takes its name from John Sevier, governor of the failed State of Franklin and first governor of Tennessee, who played a prominent role during the early years of settlement in the region. Since its establishment in 1795, the county seat has been situated at Sevierville (also named for Sevier), the eighth-oldest city in Tennessee.

Sevier County was strongly pro-Union during the Civil War. When Tennessee held a vote on the state's Ordinance of Secession on June 8, 1861, Sevier Countians voted 1,528 to 60 in favor of remaining in the Union. In November 1861, William C. Pickens, Sheriff of Sevier County, led a failed attempt to destroy the railroad bridge at Strawberry Plains as part of the East Tennessee bridge-burning conspiracy.

Prior to the late 1930s, Sevier County's population, economy, and society, which relied primarily on subsistence agriculture, held little significance vis-à-vis any other county in the rural South. However, with the creation of the Great Smoky Mountains National Park in the early 1930s, the future of Sevier County (within which lies thirty percent of the total area of the national park) changed drastically. Today, tourism supports the county's economy.

== Geography ==
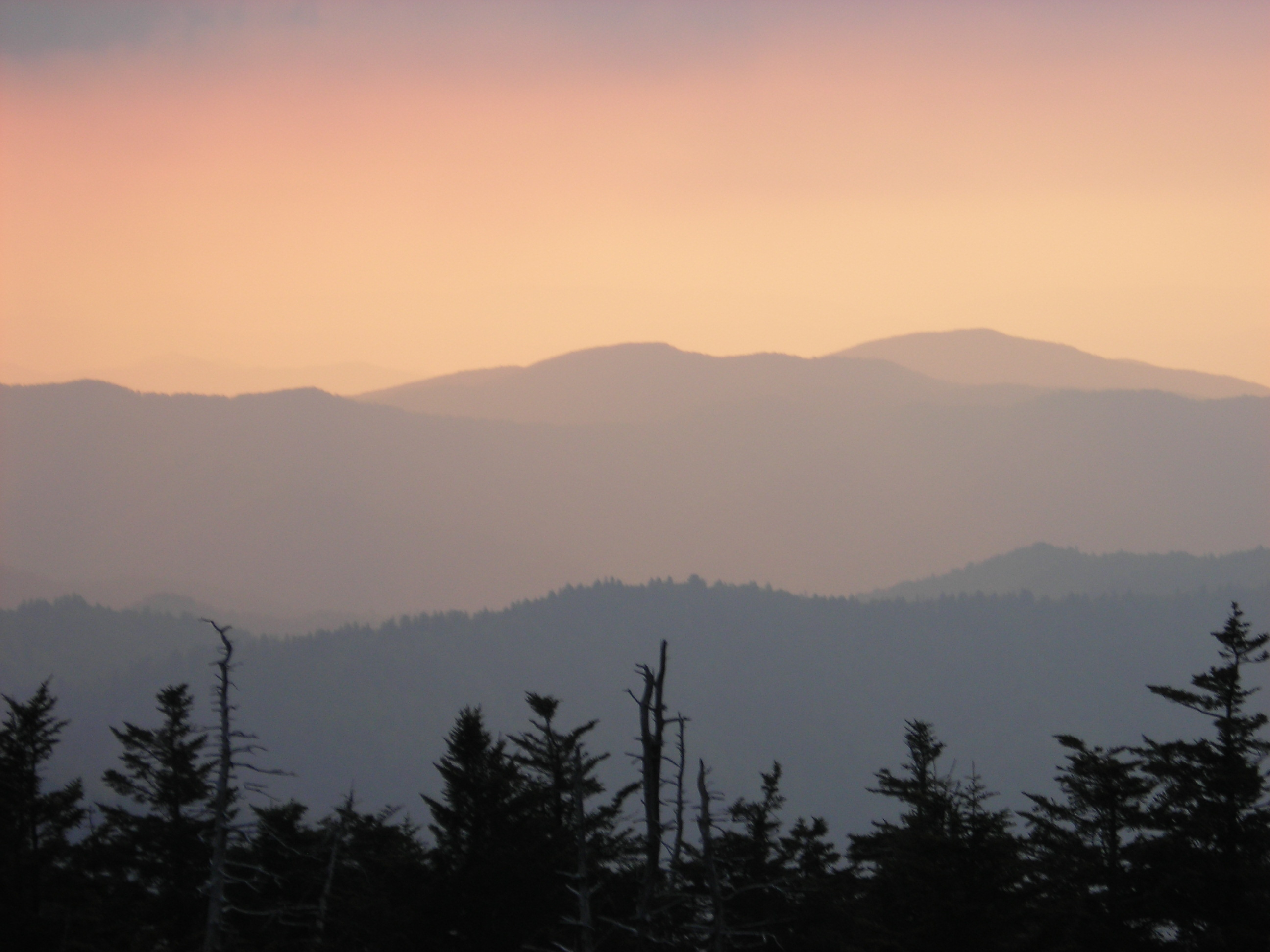
Mountains over Sevier County at sunset from the Great Smoky Mountains National Park

According to the U.S. Census Bureau, the county has a total area of 598 square miles (1,550 km^{2}), of which 593 square miles (1,540 km^{2}) is land and 5.2 square miles (13 km^{2}) (0.9%) is water. The southern part of Sevier County is located within the Great Smoky Mountains and is protected by the Great Smoky Mountains National Park. The northern parts of the county are located within the Ridge-and-Valley Appalachians. Sevier contains the highest point in Tennessee, Kuwohi (formerly Clingmans Dome), which rises to 6,643 feet (2,025 m) along the county's border with North Carolina. Mount Guyot, located in the Eastern Smokies in the extreme eastern part of the county, is the state's second-highest mountain at 6,621 feet (2,018 m). The 6,593-foot (2,010 m) Mount Le Conte, a very prominent mountain visible from much of the central part of the county, is the state's third-highest.

Sevier County is drained primarily by the French Broad River, which passes through the northern part of the county. A portion of the French Broad is part of Douglas Lake, an artificial reservoir created by Douglas Dam in the northeastern part of the county. The three forks of the Little Pigeon River (East, Middle, and West) flow northward from the Smokies, converge near Sevierville, and empty into the French Broad north of Sevierville. The West Fork is the best known, as it flows through the popular tourist areas of Gatlinburg and Pigeon Forge.

The maximum elevation differential in Sevier County is the greatest in Tennessee, ranging from a high of 6,643 feet (2,025 m) at Kuwohi to a low of 850 feet (260 m) at the French Broad River.

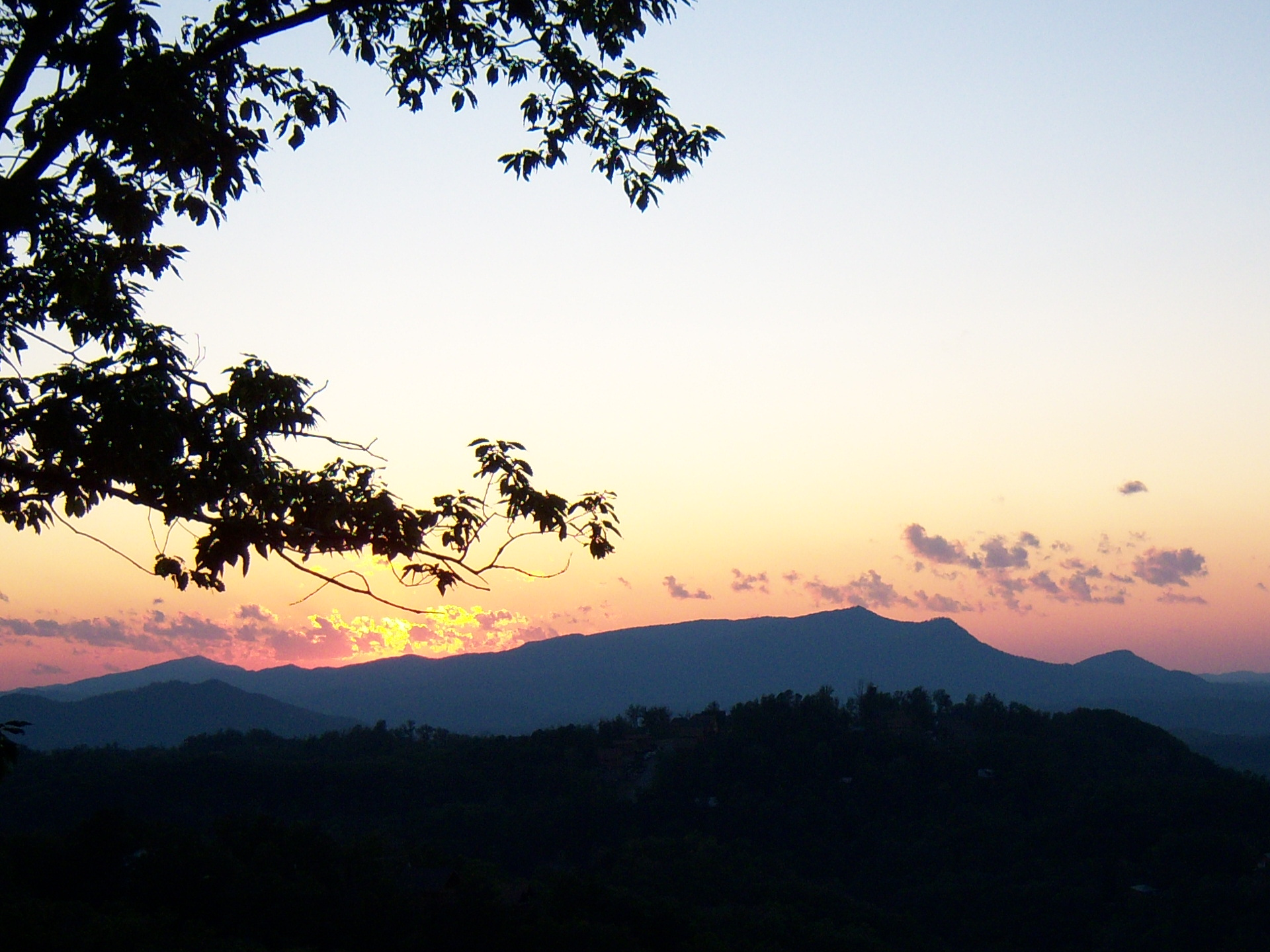
Sunset over Bluff Mountain

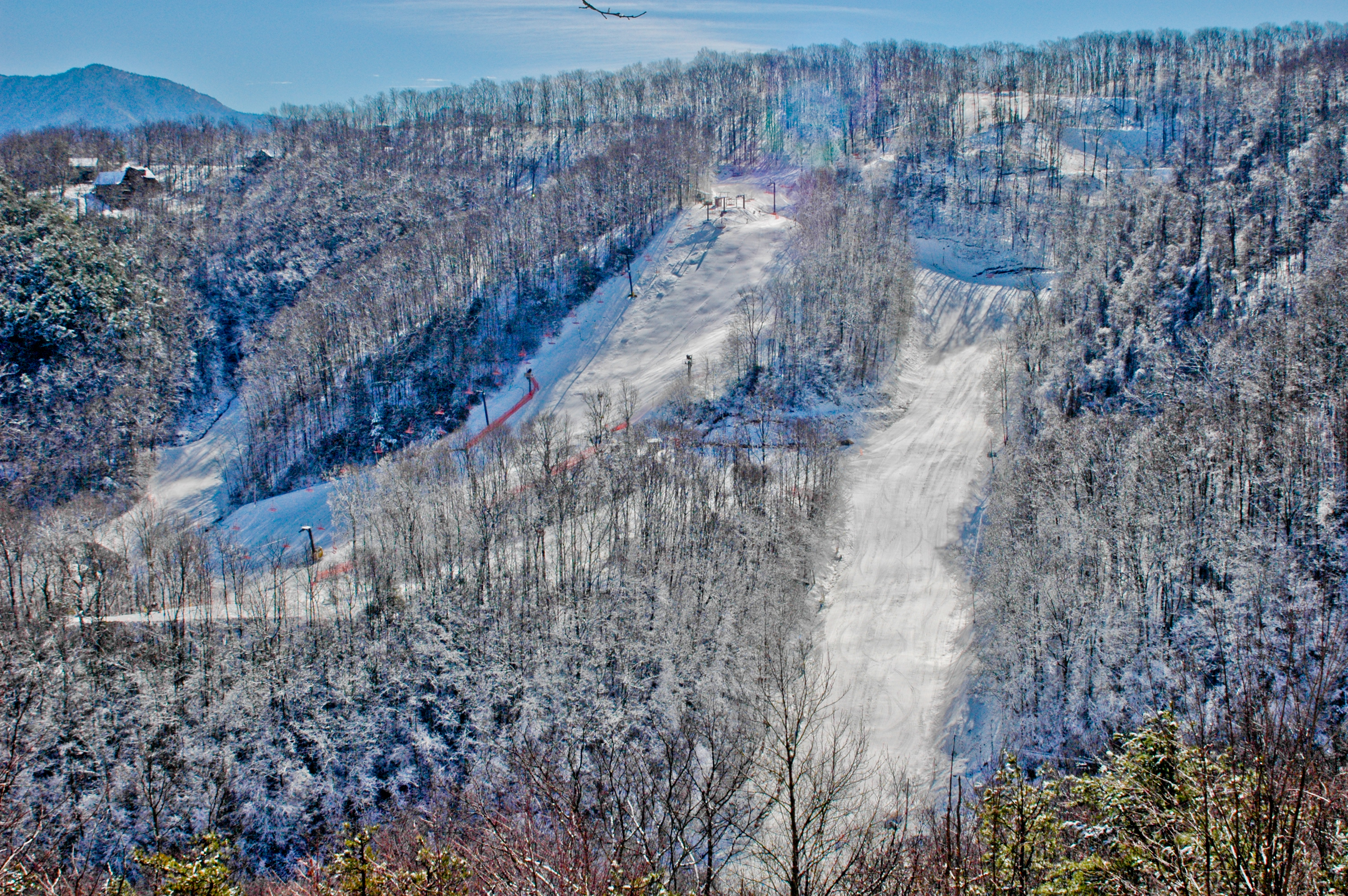
Snowy Ober Trails in Gatlinburg

=== Adjacent counties ===
- Jefferson County, Tennessee – north
- Cocke County, Tennessee – east
- Haywood County, North Carolina – southeast
- Swain County, North Carolina – south
- Blount County, Tennessee – west
- Knox County, Tennessee – northwest

=== National protected areas ===
- Appalachian Trail (part)
- Foothills Parkway (part)
- Great Smoky Mountains National Park (part)

=== State protected area ===
- Roundtop Mountain State Natural Area

== Demographics ==
Historical population
Census	Pop.	Note	%±
1800	3,419		—
1810	4,595		34.4%
1820	4,772		3.9%
1830	5,717		19.8%
1840	6,442		12.7%
1850	6,920		7.4%
1860	9,122		31.8%
1870	11,028		20.9%
1880	15,541		40.9%
1890	18,761		20.7%
1900	22,021		17.4%
1910	22,296		1.2%
1920	23,384		4.9%
1930	20,480		−12.4%
1940	23,291		13.7%
1950	23,375		0.4%
1960	24,251		3.7%
1970	28,241		16.5%
1980	41,418		46.7%
1990	51,043		23.2%
2000	71,170		39.4%
2010	89,889		26.3%
2020	98,380		9.4%
2025 (est.)	101,342	▲	3.0%
U.S. Decennial Census; 1790–1960 1900–1990; 1990–2000 2010–2014

=== Racial and ethnic composition ===
Sevier County, Tennessee – Racial and ethnic composition Note: the US Census treats Hispanic/Latino as an ethnic category. This table excludes Latinos from the racial categories and assigns them to a separate category. Hispanics/Latinos may be of any race.
Race / Ethnicity (NH = Non-Hispanic)	Pop 1980	Pop 1990	Pop 2000	Pop 2010	Pop 2020	% 1980	% 1990	% 2000	% 2010	% 2020
White alone (NH)	40,886	50,266	68,699	82,374	83,801	98.72%	98.48%	96.53%	91.64%	85.18%
Black or African American alone (NH)	162	215	391	640	766	0.39%	0.42%	0.55%	0.71%	0.78%
Native American or Alaska Native alone (NH)	46	128	218	295	312	0.11%	0.25%	0.31%	0.33%	0.32%
Asian alone (NH)	62	193	383	769	1,103	0.15%	0.38%	0.54%	0.86%	1.12%
Native Hawaiian or Pacific Islander alone (NH)	x	x	13	15	24	x	x	0.02%	0.02%	0.02%
Other race alone (NH)	28	4	24	71	254	0.07%	0.01%	0.03%	0.08%	0.26%
Mixed race or Multiracial (NH)	x	x	558	938	3,506	x	x	0.78%	1.04%	3.56%
Hispanic or Latino (any race)	234	237	884	4,787	8,614	0.56%	0.46%	1.24%	5.33%	8.76%
Total	41,418	51,043	71,170	89,889	98,380	100.00%	100.00%	100.00%	100.00%	100.00%

=== 2020 census ===
As of the 2020 census, there were 98,380 people, 39,520 households, and 26,538 families residing in the county. The median age was 44.0 years, with 20.4% of residents under the age of 18 and 20.8% of residents 65 years of age or older. For every 100 females there were 96.6 males, and for every 100 females age 18 and over there were 94.1 males age 18 and over.

There were 39,520 households in the county, of which 27.7% had children under the age of 18 living in them. Of all households, 51.2% were married-couple households, 16.8% were households with a male householder and no spouse or partner present, and 24.8% were households with a female householder and no spouse or partner present. About 24.9% of all households were made up of individuals and 11.6% had someone living alone who was 65 years of age or older.

The racial makeup of the county was 87.1% White, 0.8% Black or African American, 0.5% American Indian and Alaska Native, 1.1% Asian, <0.1% Native Hawaiian and Pacific Islander, 4.4% from some other race, and 6.1% from two or more races. Hispanic or Latino residents of any race comprised 8.8% of the population.

46.6% of residents lived in urban areas, while 53.4% lived in rural areas.

There were 56,240 housing units, of which 29.7% were vacant. Among occupied housing units, 68.5% were owner-occupied and 31.5% were renter-occupied. The homeowner vacancy rate was 1.4% and the rental vacancy rate was 14.1%.

=== 2010 census ===
As of the census of 2010, there were 89,889 people, 37,583 households, and a homeownership rate of 68.7 percent, below the state average. The population density was 120 inhabitants per square mile (46/km^{2}). There were 37,252 housing units at an average density of 63 per square mile (24/km^{2}). The racial makeup of the county was 95.80% White, 0.86% Asian, 0.80% Black or African American, 0.19% Native American, 0.02% Pacific Islander, 1.02% from other races, and 1.31% from two or more races. 5.33% of the population were Hispanic or Latino of any race.

There were 28,467 households, out of which 30.70% had children under the age of 18 living with them, 59.30% were married couples living together, 10.10% had a female householder with no husband present, and 26.80% were non-families. 22.00% of all households were made up of individuals, and 7.90% had someone living alone who was 65 years of age or older. The average household size was 2.48 and the average family size was 2.88.

In the county, the population was spread out, with 23.00% under the age of 18, 8.30% from 18 to 24, 29.80% from 25 to 44, 26.30% from 45 to 64, and 12.60% who were 65 years of age or older. The median age was 38 years. For every 100 females there were 95.90 males. For every 100 females age 18 and over, there were 92.20 males.

The median income for a household in the county was $34,719, and the median income for a family was $40,474. Males had a median income of $27,139 versus $20,646 for females. The per capita income for the county was $18,064. About 8.20% of families and 10.70% of the population were below the poverty line, including 13.10% of those under age 18 and 10.10% of those age 65 or over.

Sevier County was Tennessee's third fastest-growing county by percentage change in population between the 1990 census and 2000 census.

== Government ==
The head of the Sevier County government, the county mayor (known as county executive until 2003), is elected in county-wide elections. The mayor serves along with a 25-member board of elected commissioners representing districts covering the many small communities spread across the county.

=== Presidential elections ===
United States presidential election results for Sevier County, Tennessee
Year	Republican		Democratic		Third party(ies)	
Year	No.	%	No.	%	No.	%
1868	1,264	96.86%	41	3.14%	0	0.00%
1872	1,176	89.50%	138	10.50%	0	0.00%
1876	1,540	81.83%	342	18.17%	0	0.00%
1880	2,052	82.64%	431	17.36%	0	0.00%
1884	2,242	82.25%	468	17.17%	16	0.59%
1888	2,830	84.00%	489	14.51%	50	1.48%
1892	2,463	82.18%	461	15.38%	73	2.44%
1896	3,376	88.66%	428	11.24%	4	0.11%
1900	2,595	86.99%	382	12.81%	6	0.20%
1904	2,886	90.44%	300	9.40%	5	0.16%
1908	3,130	91.44%	291	8.50%	2	0.06%
1912	967	26.00%	341	9.17%	2,411	64.83%
1916	2,837	90.38%	301	9.59%	1	0.03%
1920	6,006	93.60%	404	6.30%	7	0.11%
1924	3,517	88.17%	448	11.23%	24	0.60%
1928	3,858	92.50%	308	7.38%	5	0.12%
1932	3,075	77.01%	887	22.21%	31	0.78%
1936	4,126	77.73%	1,144	21.55%	38	0.72%
1940	4,569	79.46%	1,181	20.54%	0	0.00%
1944	4,930	87.24%	711	12.58%	10	0.18%
1948	5,049	84.11%	840	13.99%	114	1.90%
1952	7,244	87.17%	1,066	12.83%	0	0.00%
1956	6,950	86.46%	1,043	12.98%	45	0.56%
1960	7,818	85.05%	1,341	14.59%	33	0.36%
1964	6,821	69.49%	2,995	30.51%	0	0.00%
1968	7,629	74.67%	1,112	10.88%	1,476	14.45%
1972	8,273	86.38%	1,128	11.78%	177	1.85%
1976	7,608	64.40%	3,993	33.80%	213	1.80%
1980	10,576	73.25%	3,450	23.89%	413	2.86%
1984	12,517	78.03%	3,384	21.10%	140	0.87%
1988	11,920	76.26%	3,643	23.31%	68	0.44%
1992	11,714	55.08%	6,719	31.60%	2,833	13.32%
1996	11,847	56.83%	7,136	34.23%	1,863	8.94%
2000	16,734	65.97%	8,208	32.36%	423	1.67%
2004	22,143	71.50%	8,621	27.84%	206	0.67%
2008	24,922	73.43%	8,604	25.35%	415	1.22%
2012	25,984	76.73%	7,418	21.91%	462	1.36%
2016	28,629	78.84%	6,297	17.34%	1,386	3.82%
2020	33,783	77.60%	8,721	20.03%	1,031	2.37%
2024	35,207	80.07%	8,322	18.93%	441	1.00%

Sevier County, like most of East Tennessee, votes strongly Republican in Presidential elections. The only election in which a Republican failed to carry it was in 1912, when the Progressive Theodore Roosevelt carried it. It has not been carried by a Democrat since 1832, when it went for Andrew Jackson. In 1916 it gave Charles Hughes 90.38 percent of the vote—reportedly his highest percentage of any county in the nation. In 1932 Herbert Hoover received 77.01% of the vote and in 1936 Alf Landon received 77.73%. Since 1916 no Republican candidate has received less than 55% of the county's vote and in 2008 John McCain received 73.4%. All of the county's state legislators are Republicans, and Republican candidates routinely garner well over 70 percent of the vote on the occasions they face opposition at all.

At local elections, the county is similarly Republican. However, the county backed Senator Al Gore in 1990 and Governor Phil Bredesen in 2006 in landslides.

== Economy ==
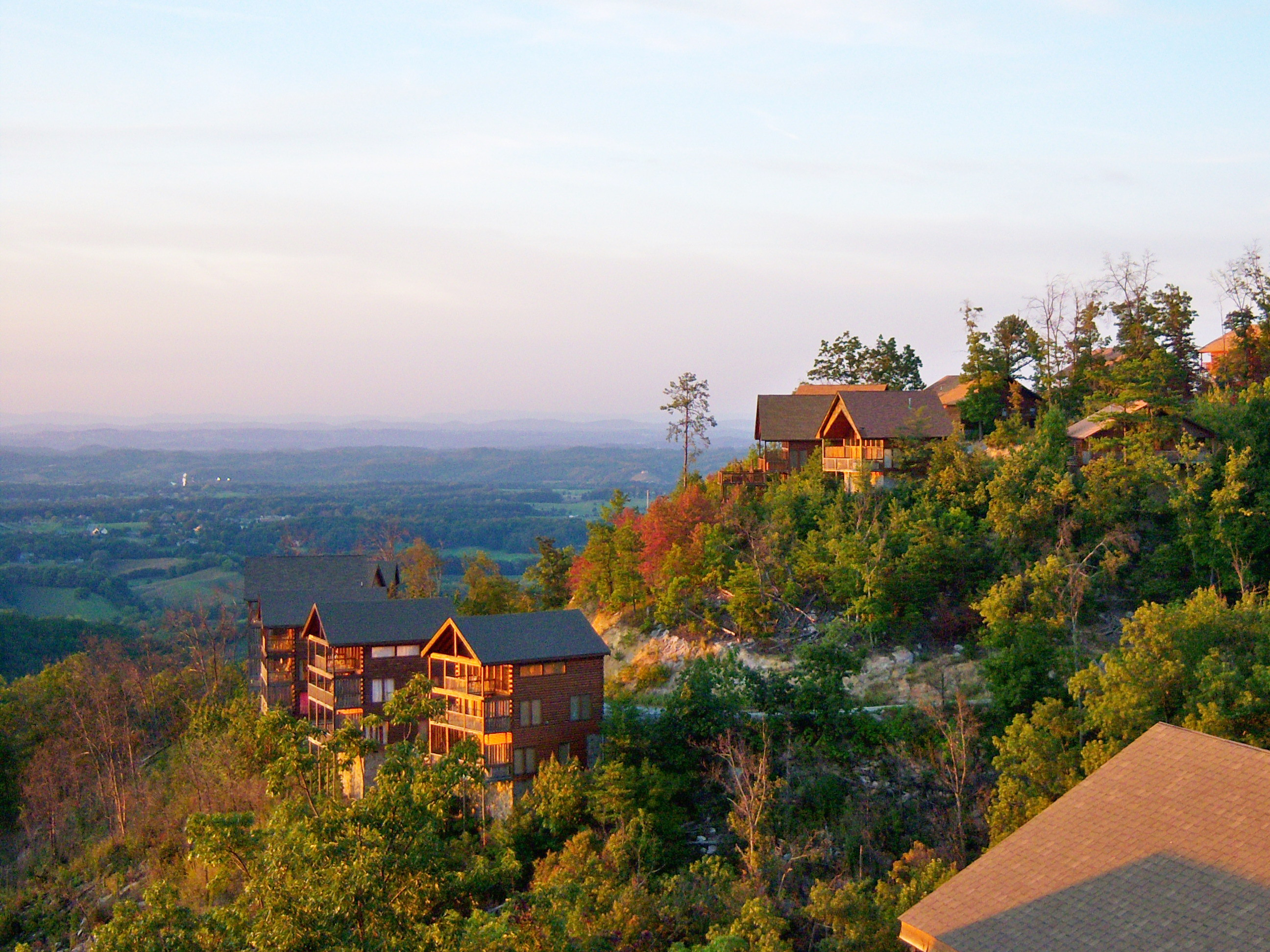
Rental cabins in the Smokies

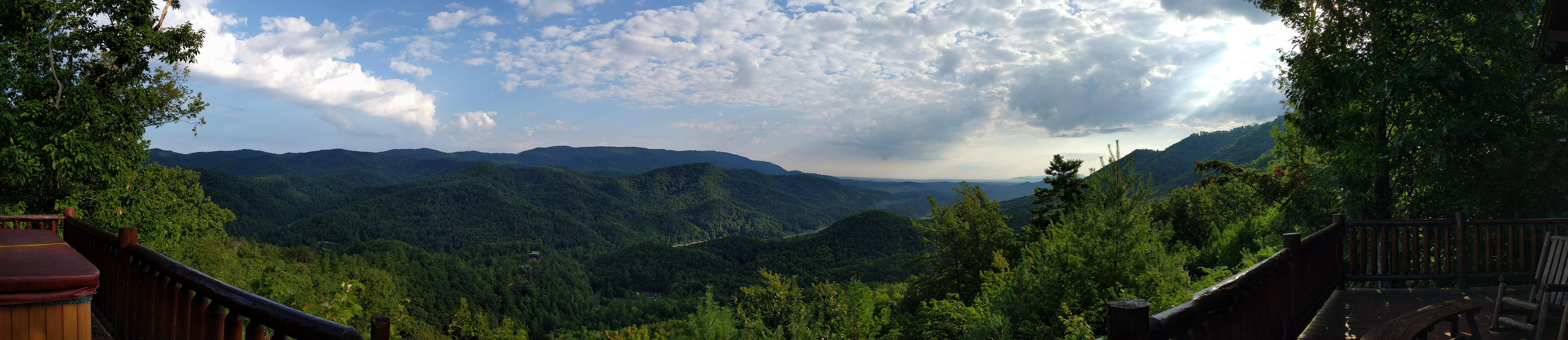
Overlooking Walden Creek Road in Sevier County, Tennessee

From its beginnings as a traditional subsistence-based farming society, Sevier County has grown into a major tourist destination since the establishment of the Great Smoky Mountains National Park, which dominates the southern portion of the county. One of the very reasons for the park's creation, however, was also one of the county's first major economic engines: the lumber industry. Establishments in what is now the national park felled large amounts of timber in the early 1900s. Though the park effectively killed the logging industry in the late 1930s, it spurred the development of one of the largest tourist resorts in the United States of America, as the Great Smoky Mountains National Park is now the most visited national park in the country. Sevier County now has the third largest tourism economy in Tennessee, ranking behind Nashville and Memphis, the state's two largest cities.

The commercial cabin rental industry has grown tremendously in recent years.

=== Tourist attractions ===
The tourism industry drives the county's economy. The following destinations are among the most lucrative for the area:

- Great Smoky Mountains National Park, southern Sevier County: Established in 1936 and propelling the tourism industry in Sevier County ever since, the national park is the most visited in the United States, welcoming over 10 million nature enthusiasts every year, most of whom arrive through Sevier County.
- Dollywood, Pigeon Forge: The theme park named for part-owner Dolly Parton (who was born in Locust Ridge) admits nearly 3 million guests a year, making it both the most popular theme park and most frequented attraction (after the Great Smoky Mountains National Park) in Tennessee.
- Ripley's Aquarium of the Smokies, Gatlinburg: Opened in 2000 and designated the most visited aquarium in the United States in 2001, when over 2 million tourists passed through its galleries, Ripley's Aquarium of the Smokies is the largest single tourist draw in Gatlinburg.
- Ober Gatlinburg, Gatlinburg: The Ober Gatlinburg ski resort sits above Gatlinburg, offering numerous attractions for visitors unique to the county, including winter ski slopes and an indoor ice skating rink. The tramway that takes visitors to and from the resort is touted as "America's Largest Aerial Tramway."
- Smoky Mountain Opry, Pigeon Forge: A musical revue stage show that debuted in 2011. It offers both that program during the majority of the year, as well as the "Christmas Spectacular" during the winter months.
- Foxfire Mountain Themed Adventure Park, Sevierville: A 150-acre wilderness theme park located in the foothills of the Great Smoky Mountains offers a wide range of outdoor adventures including: zip lining, ATV tours, climbing walls, free-fall jumps, aerial adventure courses, hiking trails and the longest swinging bridge in the United States.

== Education ==
There is one school district in the county, Sevier County School District.

Head Start:

- Boyds Creek Headstart, on Boyds Creek Highway
- Douglas Dam Headstart, in Sevierville
- Harrisburg Headstart, on Old Harrisburg Road
- Wearwood Headstart, in Sevierville
- Underwood Headstart, in Kodak

Preschool:

- Trula Lawson Early Childhood Center, in Sevierville

Elementary/middle schools:

- Boyds Creek Elementary, in Sevierville
- Caton's Chapel Elementary, on Caton's Chapel Road
- Jones Cove Elementary, on Jones Cove Road
- New Center School, in Sevierville
- Northview Primary, in Kodak
- Northview Intermediate, in Kodak
- Pi Beta Phi Elementary, in Gatlinburg
- Pigeon Forge Middle, in Pigeon Forge
- Pigeon Forge Primary, in Pigeon Forge
- Pittman Center School, in Pittman Center
- Sevierville Intermediate, in Sevierville
- Sevierville Middle, in Sevierville
- Sevierville Primary, in Sevierville
- Seymour Middle, Seymour
- Seymour Intermediate, Seymour
- Seymour Primary, Seymour
- Wearwood Elementary, Sevierville

High schools:

- Gatlinburg-Pittman High School, in Gatlinburg
- Northview Academy, in Kodak
- Pigeon Forge High School, in Pigeon Forge
- Sevier County High School, in Sevierville
- Seymour High School, in Seymour
- Vocational Center (at Sevier County High School), in Sevierville

Other schools:

- Covenant Christian Academy, on Old Newport Highway
- Day School, in Sevierville
- King's Academy, in Seymour
- My Audie's Place, in Pigeon Forge
- New Hope Church of God, in Sevierville
- Raggedy Andy's Playhouse Inc., in Sevierville

=== Colleges and universities ===
There are two post-secondary institutions in the county, both located in Sevierville. The first is a satellite campus of the Morristown-based Walters State Community College. The second is a satellite campus of Johnson City-based East Tennessee State University.

== Parks ==
In addition to the federally operated Great Smoky Mountains National Park, Sevier County is home to numerous smaller community parks, primarily within the cities of Sevierville, Pigeon Forge, and Gatlinburg. The most significant of them are listed as follows:

- Holt Park (Gatlinburg)
- Mills Park (Gatlinburg)
- Mynatt Park (Gatlinburg)
- Northview Optimist Park (Kodak)
- Patriot Park (Pigeon Forge)
- Pigeon Forge City Park
- Sevierville City Park

== Transportation ==
The massive development of the tourism industry in Sevier County has put a major stress on the county's roadways. In an effort to control this the county has put forth numerous projects to widen existing highways, and the cities of Pigeon Forge and Gatlinburg have also implemented a bus service oriented towards visitors, which ferries tourists to and from various popular destinations throughout the towns via decorated buses referred to as "trolleys."

=== Highways ===
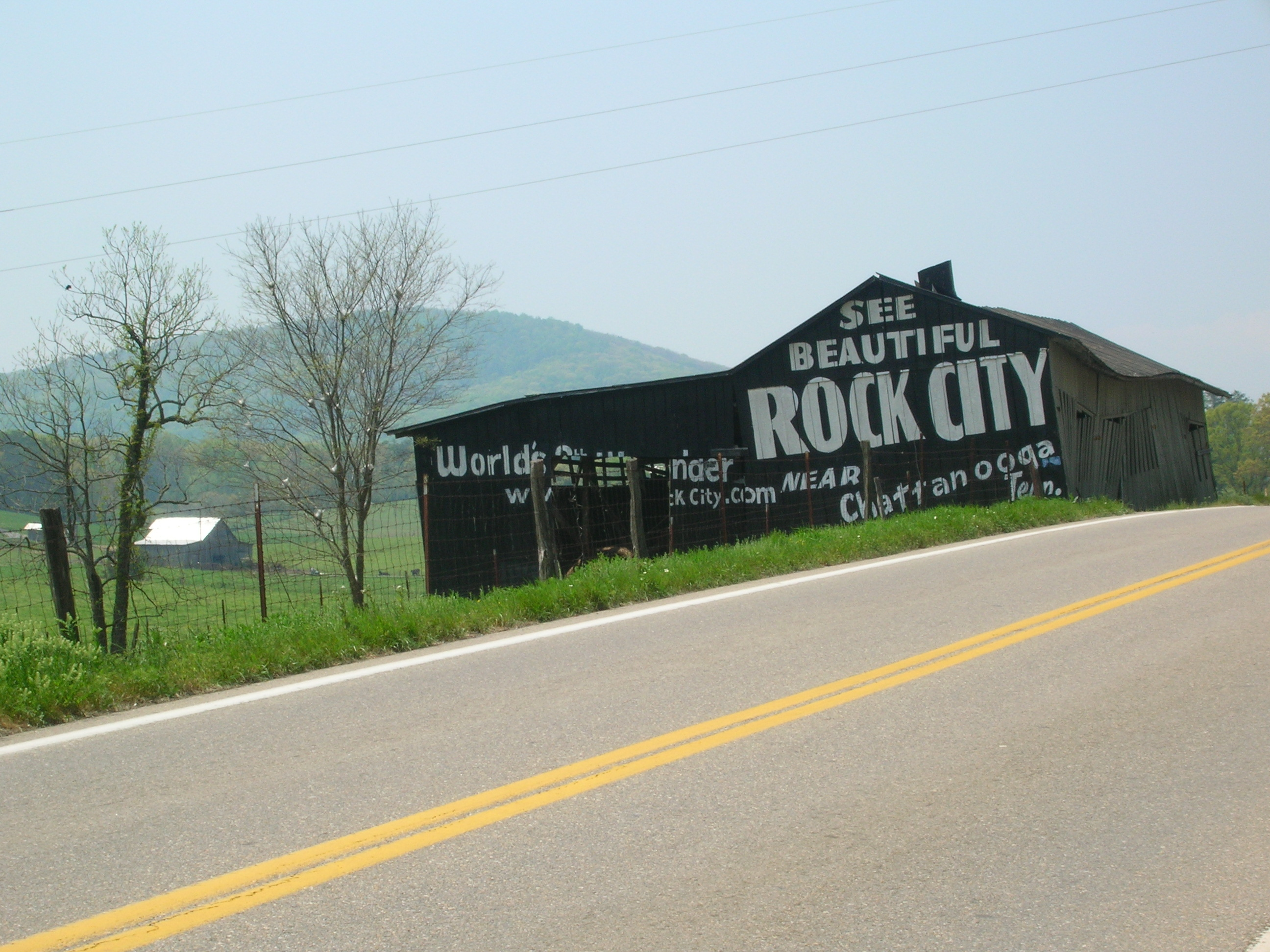
This Rock City Barn is located just off of U.S. 411, in northeast Sevier County

- Interstate 40
- U.S. Route 321
- U.S. Route 411
- U.S. Route 441
- State Route 35
- State Route 66
- State Route 71
- State Route 73
- State Route 73 Scenic
- State Route 139
- State Route 338
- State Route 339
- State Route 416
- State Route 448
- State Route 449
- State Route 454

The Great Smoky Mountains Parkway connects Interstate 40 (Exit 407) to the national park via the cities of Sevierville, Pigeon Forge, and Gatlinburg. From the exit, the Parkway follows Tennessee State Route 66 ("Winfield Dunn Parkway") into Sevierville, where it becomes U.S. Route 441/Tennessee State Route 71 as TN-66 terminates at a four-way intersection where US-441 splits from U.S. Route 411 and changes direction. It continues along US-441 through Pigeon Forge and Gatlinburg, before entering the national park, where it ascends to the crest of the Smokies at Newfound Gap and crosses into North Carolina (although by this time it is no longer known as the "Great Smoky Mountains Parkway"). The Parkway is joined U.S. Route 321 in Pigeon Forge and they run concurrently until US-321 splits away in downtown Gatlinburg. Along this stretch of U.S. and Tennessee highways, a nearly continuous tourist sprawl (separated only by a spur route of the Foothills Parkway, known as "the spur") has emerged in the three communities.

=== Airports ===
Gatlinburg-Pigeon Forge Airport (KGKT)

== Communities ==
Sevier County, like much of rural Southern Appalachia, consists of relatively few incorporated municipalities and numerous unincorporated settlements.

=== Cities ===
- Gatlinburg
- Pigeon Forge
- Sevierville (county seat)

=== Town ===
- Pittman Center

=== Census-designated places ===
- Fairgarden
- Seymour (partial)

=== Unincorporated communities ===
- Alder Branch
- Beech Springs
- Boyds Creek
- Catlettsburg
- Caton
- Cherokee Hills
- DuPont
- Kodak
- Locust Ridge
- Oldham
- Reagantown
- Richardson Cove
- Shady Grove
- Strawberry Plains (partial)
- Wears Valley (census county division)
- Whites School

== Notable people ==
- Irene Baker (1901–1994), U.S. Congresswoman
- David Baker, Assistant District Attorney General for Greene County and participant in the January 6 United States Capitol attack
- Reese Bowen Brabson (1817–1863), U.S. Congressman
- Edwin Cunningham (1868–1953), United States Consul General in Shanghai, 1920–1935
- Richard "Preacher Dick" Evans (1824–1901), Baptist preacher
- Robert H. Hodsden (1806–1864), Southern Unionist and state legislator
- Leonidas C. Houk (1836–1891), U.S. Congressman
- Charles Inman (1810–1899), Southern Unionist and state legislator
- John P. McCown (1815–1879), Confederate general
- Bashful Brother Oswald (1911–2002), country musician and entertainer
- Dolly Parton (1946–2026), country music singer-songwriter, actress, philanthropist, author, businesswoman, Ambassador To The Great Smoky Mountains
- Randy Parton (1953–2021), country music singer-songwriter, actor, and businessman
- Stella Parton (born 1949), country music singer-songwriter and businesswoman
- John Henninger Reagan (1818–1905), U.S. Senator and Confederate cabinet member
- Benny Sims (1924–1994), bluegrass musician
- William Stone (1791–1853), U.S. Congressman
- John Tipton (1786–1839), U.S. Senator
- Cas Walker (1902–1998), grocery store magnate and politician

== In popular culture ==
- Sevier County is the setting for the novels The Orchard Keeper and Child of God by Cormac McCarthy.
- Gatlinburg was the site of the showdown between Sue and his father in the Johnny Cash hit, "A Boy Named Sue".
- Country singer Ronnie Milsap's "Smoky Mountain Rain" refers to a truck driver taking the heartbroken narrator "as far as Gatlinburg" from Knoxville

== See also ==
- National Register of Historic Places listings in Sevier County, Tennessee
