= Sugarland Mountain Trail =

Hiking trail in Sevier County, Tennessee

Coordinates: 35.5906°N 83.4742°W

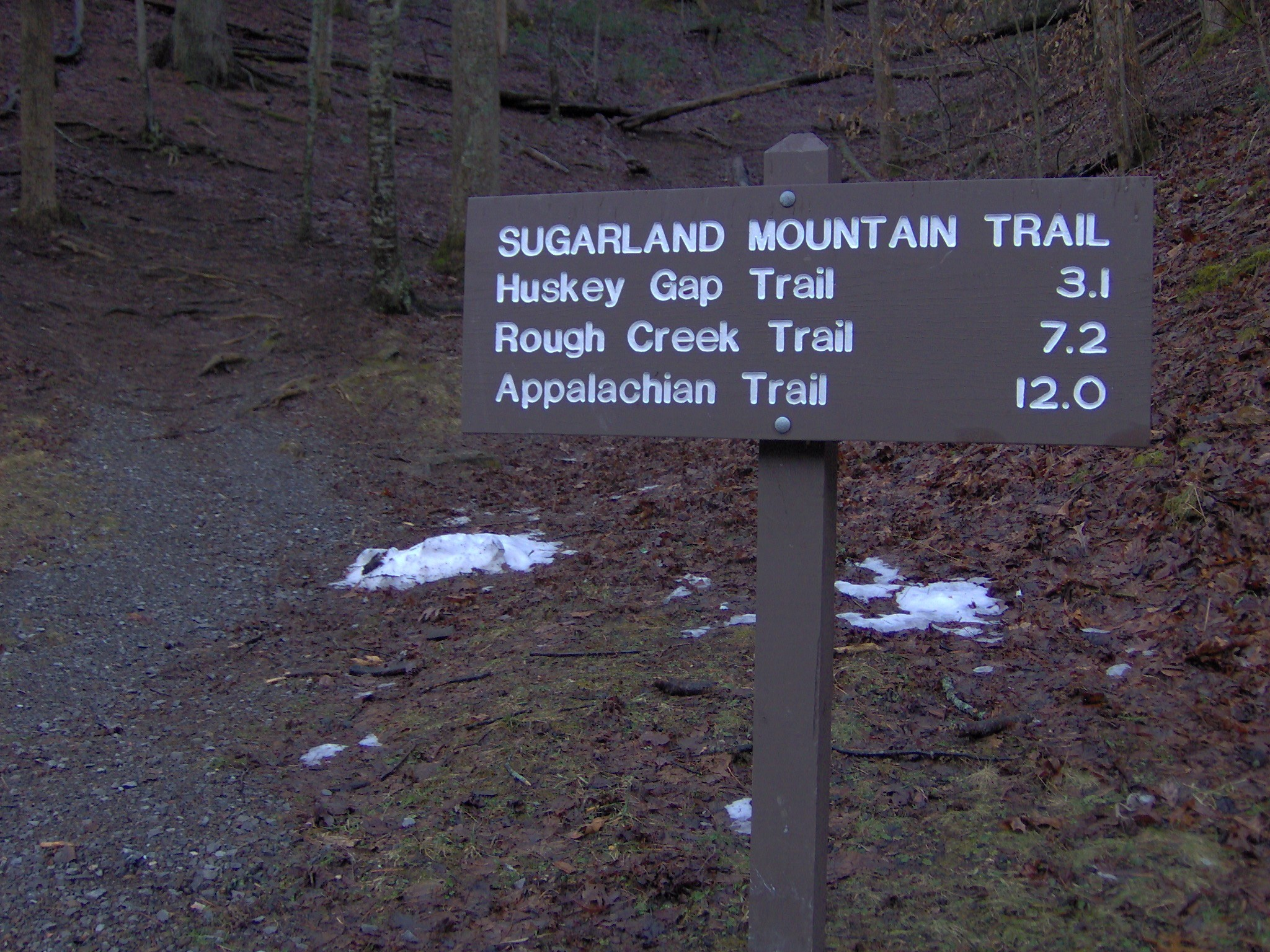
- Sugarland Mountain Trailhead at Fighting Creek Gap
- Length: 12 mi (19 km)
- Location: Great Smoky Mountains National Park, Tennessee, United States
- Trailheads: Fighting Creek Gap (along Little River Road, W. of Gatlinburg); Junction with the Appalachian Trail near the summit of Mount Collins
- Use: Hiking
- Highest point: Appalachian Trail junction, 5,900 ft (1,800 m)
- Lowest point: Fighting Creek Gap, 2,300 ft (700 m)
- Difficulty: Moderate-to-Strenuous
- Season: Open year-round
- Sights: Views of Mount Le Conte, Gatlinburg and Sevier County to the east, Blanket Mountain and Upper Little River Valley to the west; multiple forest types
- Hazards: Steep ledges, ice hazards in colder months

The Sugarland Mountain Trail is an American hiking trail, in the Great Smoky Mountains National Park of Sevier County, Tennessee. The trail traverses Sugarland Mountain, a massive ridge running perpendicular to the main crest of the Smokies and effectively dividing the park's north-central section from its northwestern section. Sugarland Mountain is flanked by the deep upper valleys of two of the park's major watersheds— the West Fork of the Little Pigeon River (to the east) and Little River (to the west). The trail passes through several forest types, including deciduous forest at lower elevations, heaths ("hells") along the mountain's backbone formations, and a stand of Southern Appalachian spruce-fir forest in the upper elevations. Occasional breaks in the foliage allow for views of Mount Le Conte and Sevier County to the east and Blanket Mountain and the ridges above Elkmont to the west.

The trailhead is located at Fighting Creek Gap along Little River Road, between Gatlinburg and Elkmont. The trail's terminus is located just off Clingmans Dome Road, where the trail intersects the Appalachian Trail.

== Vital information ==
- The Sugarland Mountain Trailhead at Fighting Creek Gap shares a parking lot with the popular Laurel Falls Trail (on the other side of the road). This parking lot fills up quickly on weekends, especially during Spring and Summer.
- Backcountry campsite #21, formerly located on the Sugarland Mountain Trail near the Junction with Huskey Gap Trail, has been relocated to the Huskey Gap Trail near the junction with Little River Trail.
- While there is a small parking lot (shared with the Fork Ridge Trail) near the trail terminus along Clingmans Dome Road, this road is closed December 1 through April 1. If the road is closed, the nearest parking lot is at Newfound Gap, 4.5 miles (7.2 km) east of the trail terminus.
- The Mount Collins Shelter is approximately 11.5 miles (18.5 km) from the trailhead.
- During cooler months, ice often forms on rock outcroppings along the trail between Huskey Gap and the Rough Creek junction. As the afternoon sun heats the western slopes of the mountain, this ice can break off and crash to the ground without warning. Ice and snow can also make the steeper ledges between the Rough Creek junction and the trail terminus slippery.
- The Sugarland Mountain Trail— when conjoined with the Cove Mountain Trail, Laurel Falls Trail, Fork Ridge Trail, and Deep Creek Trail— forms a 40-mile (64 km) continuous path connecting the Sugarland Visitor Center (near Gatlinburg) with the Deep Creek Campground (near Bryson City).

== Landmarks/overlooks ==
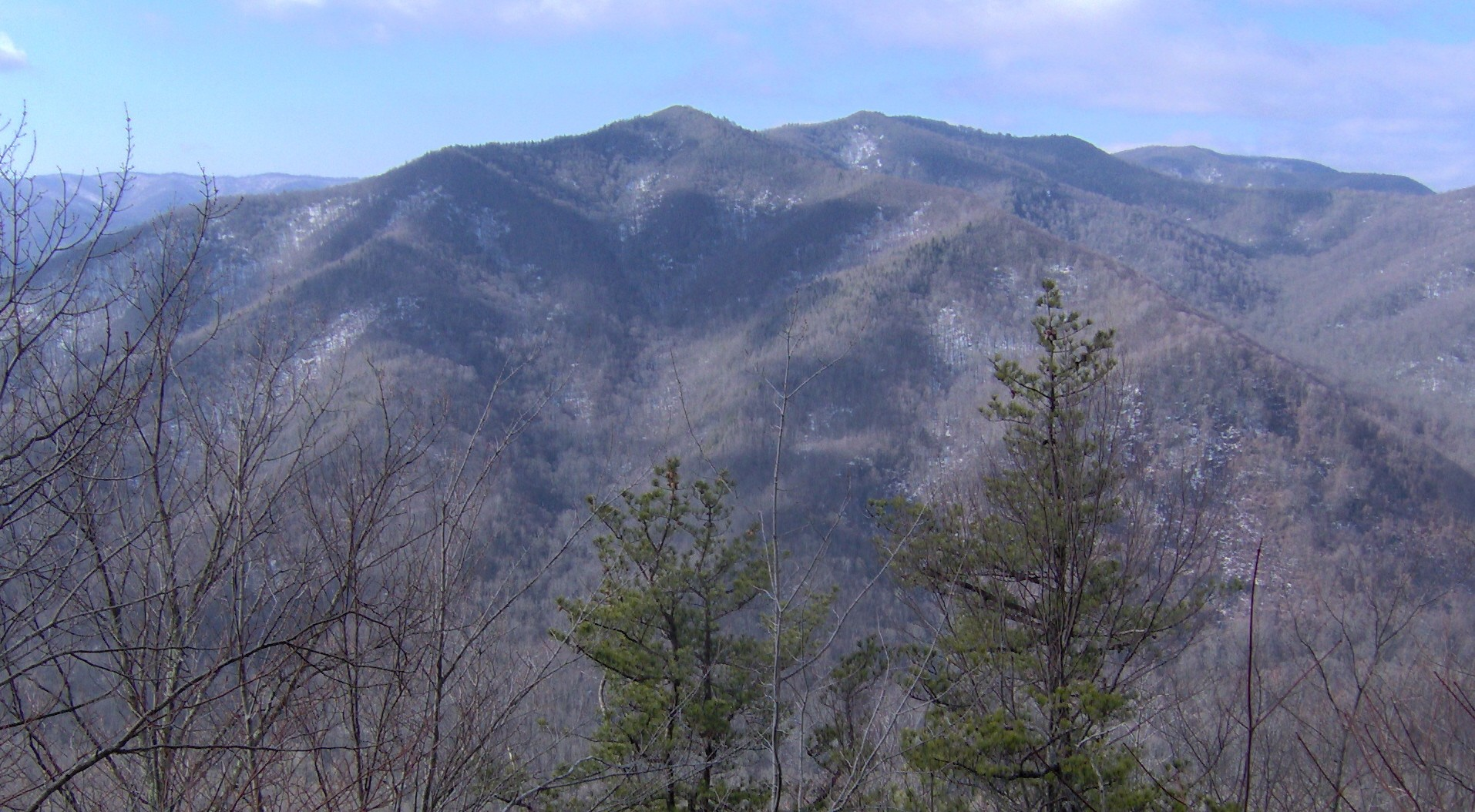
Looking west from an overlook appx. 6 miles from the trailhead

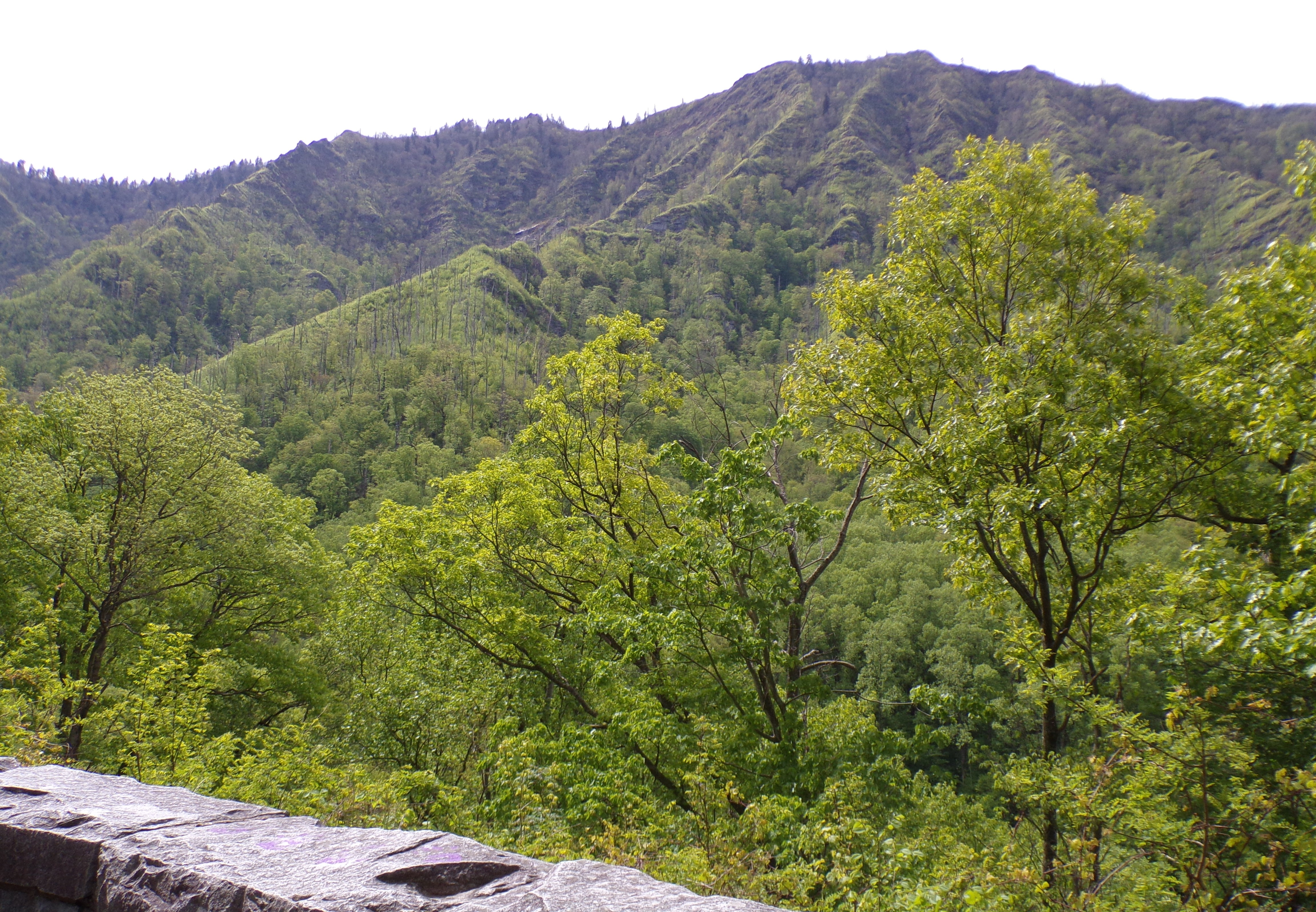
Sugarland mountain

- Little River Road (0.0 miles)
- Break in foliage allowing for view of Mount Le Conte (appx. 1 mile)
- Mids Gap (appx. 1.5 miles)
- Huskey Gap Trail junction (3.1 miles)
- Small overlook (boulder pile) allowing for view of Miry Ridge and Blanket Mountain to the west (appx. 6 miles)
- Rough Creek Trail junction (7.3 miles)
- Break in foliage allowing for view of Rough Creek Valley and Sweet Ridge to the west and north (appx. 8 miles)
- Trail passes just below summit of Sugarland Mountain (appx. 10 miles)
- Mount Collins and Mount Mingus visible (appx. 10 miles)
- Mount Collins Shelter (11.5 miles)
- Terminus at the Appalachian Trail (12.0 miles)
- Break in foliage allowing for view of the Deep Creek Valley (just west of trail terminus)
- Mount Collins summit (0.5 miles west of trail terminus)
- Appalachian Trail/Mountains-to-Sea Trail junction, path to Clingmans Dome Road (just east of trail terminus)

== Geographical information ==
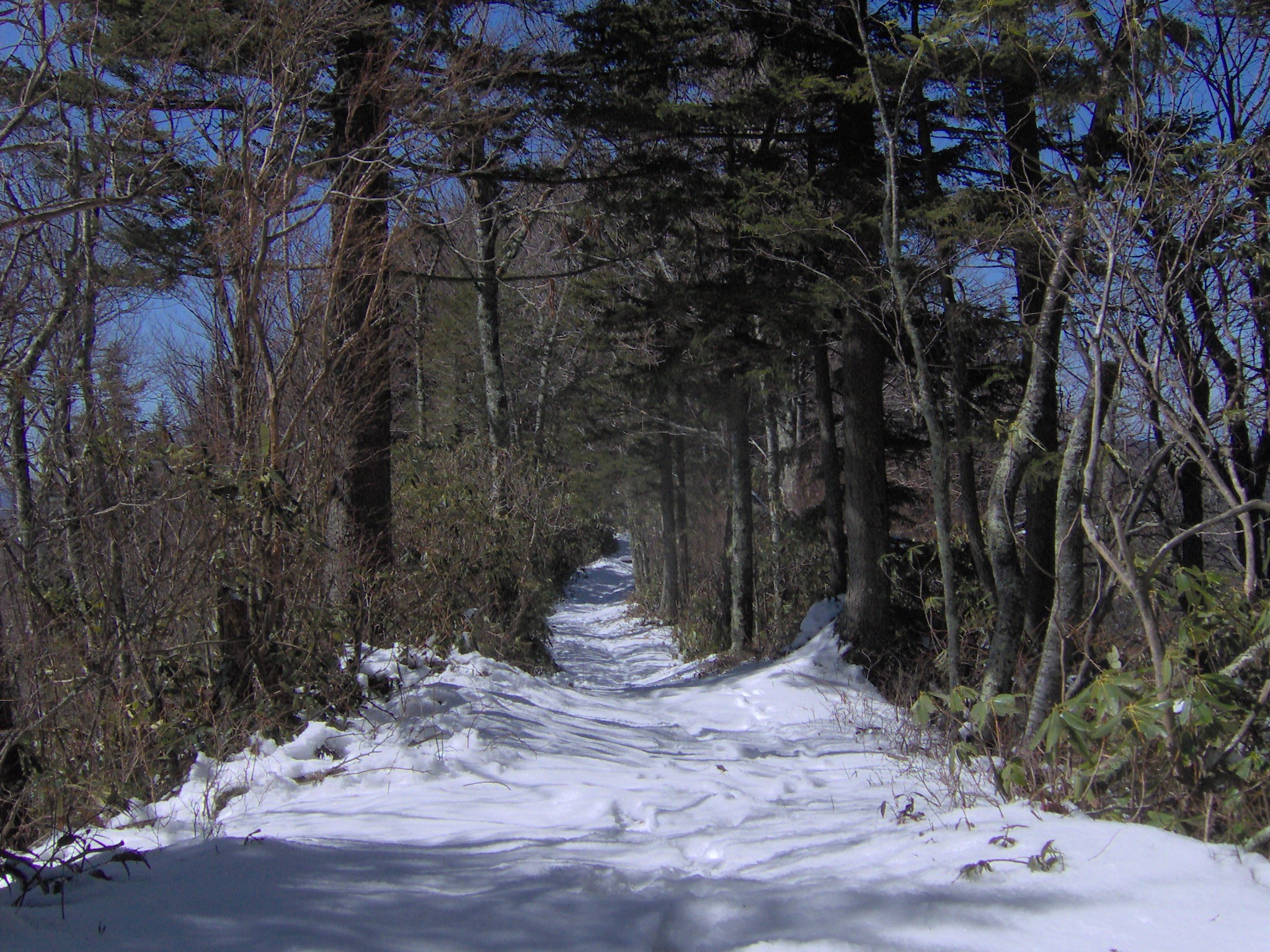
The trail crossing a backbone 9-10 miles from the trailhead. The snow on the left will eventually end up in Little River, 2000 feet below. The snow on the right will end up in the Little Pigeon River.

Sugarland Mountain is a ridge that consists of a series knobs and peaks, each increasing in elevation as the mountain approaches its junction with the main Smokies crest. The northernmost knobs, which overlook Fighting Creek Gap and Mids Gap, have elevations of around 3,000 feet (910 m). Beyond Huskey Gap, the mountain rises sharply to its prominent 4,833-foot (1,473 m) northern peak as the crest narrows, and maintains an elevation of 4,300 feet (1,300 m) to 4,800 feet (1,500 m) for several miles. At the headwaters of Rough Creek, the mountain rises above 5,000 feet (1,500 m) for the first time, eventually reaching 5,494 feet (1,675 m) at its summit. The Chimney Tops, which consist of two barren slate capstones, crown a narrow ridge that branches off the southeastern slope of Sugarland Mountain, opposite the Rough Creek headwaters. Sugarland Mountain's various knobs and peaks are typically connected by narrow "backbone" ridges, some of which are just a few feet wide. The relatively broad Huskey Gap— between the mountain's northern peak and its lower northern knobs— is the exception.

Several mountain streams have their sources high on slopes of Sugarland Mountain. Streams on the western side of the mountain include Mids Branch, Phoebe Branch, Big Medicine Branch, and Rough Creek. These all empty into Little River, which proceeds northward to Elkmont, veers west through the Little River Gorge, and turns north again to traverse Blount County before emptying into the Fort Loudoun Lake impoundment of the Tennessee River. Streams on the western side of the mountain include Sugarland Branch, Hickory King Branch, and Road Prong. These empty into the West Fork of the Little Pigeon River, which proceeds northward through Gatlinburg, Pigeon Forge and Sevierville, where it merges with the Little Pigeon River proper before emptying into the French Broad River.

== Historical information ==
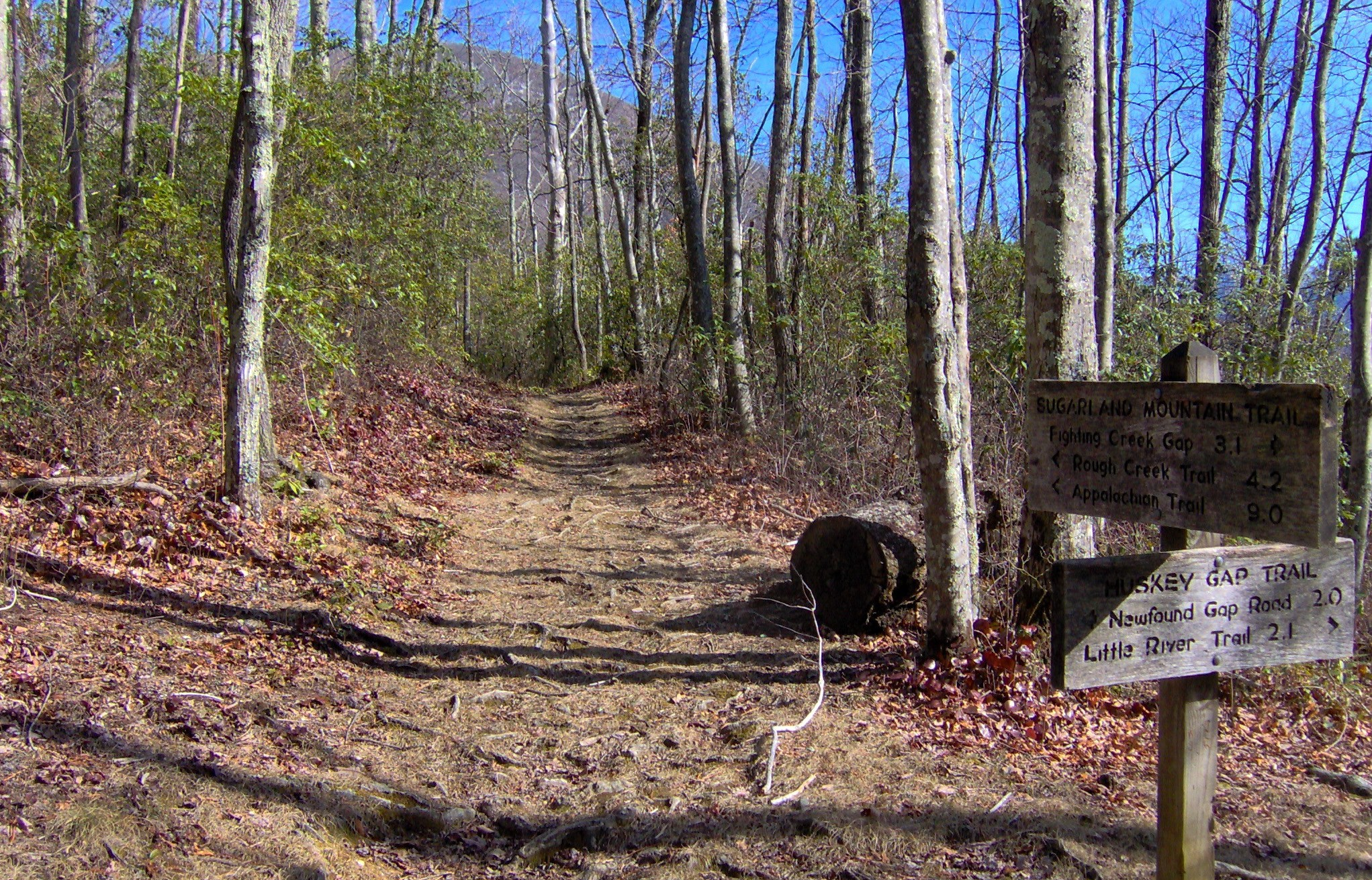
The Sugarland Mountain Trail at Huskey Gap, with the northern peak visible through the treeline

In Cherokee lore, the eastern slopes of Sugarland Mountain— along with the northern slopes of Mount Le Conte— were part of a ridgeline known as Walasi'yi, or "Frog Place." An ancient Native American trail— possibly predating the Cherokee— crossed the crest at Indian Gap and descended along Road Prong to the West Fork of the Little Pigeon Valley. The trail then followed the valley northward, where it intersected the Great Indian Warpath near modern Sevierville. This trail was expanded several times by Euro-American settlers throughout the 19th century. While the main road gradually shifted to the lower Newfound Gap, the Road Prong Trail still follows this ancient road.

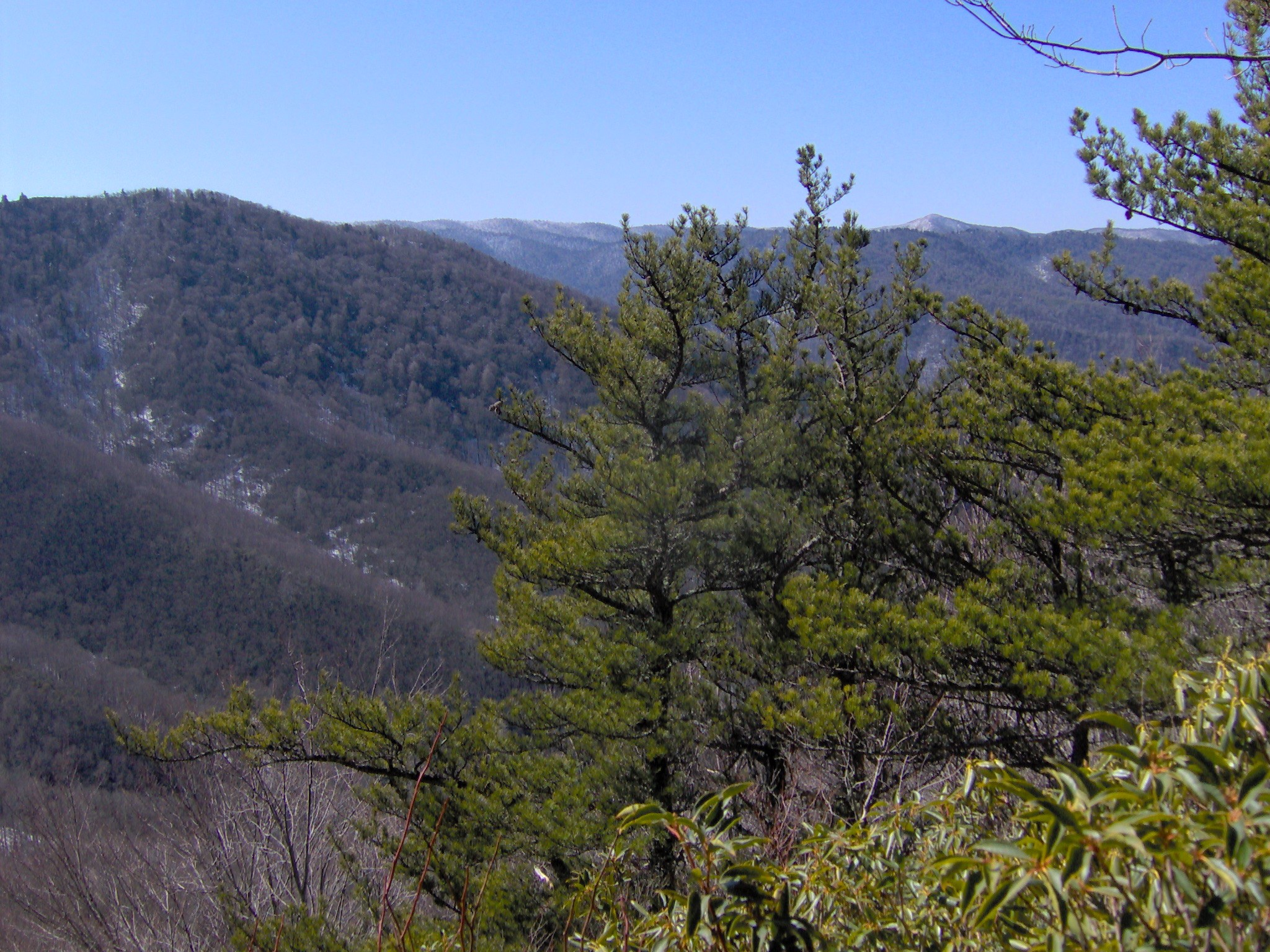
The Rough Creek Valley - Horace Kephart's "Godforsaken"

In the late 19th century, the residents of Little River (now Elkmont) and the Sugarlands built a log schoolhouse at Huskey Gap. To allow easier access to the school, they constructed a crude road along what is now the Huskey Gap Trail. Although the schoolhouse had burned down by 1916, the trail received continued use by Sugarlanders working in logging camps in the Elkmont vicinity in the 1920s. By the time the Great Smoky Mountains Park Commission started buying up tracts of land in the late 1920s for the formation of the national park, the Little River Lumber Company owned the entire western side of Sugarland Mountain and the Champion Fibre Company owned the mountain's southeastern section. Members of the Parton family and Huskey family owned small farms around Huskey Gap and the headwaters of Sugarland Branch, and members of the Quilliams family lived in the vicinity of Backcountry Campsite 21.

Author Horace Kephart, writing in the early 20th century, described Sugarland Mountain as a "razorback ridge" that formed a "rampart tedious to scale from either side." Kephart referred to the upper Rough Creek Valley on the mountain's southwestern slope as "Godforsaken" — a remote land that seemed "unearthly in its dreariness and desolation." In "A Raid Into the Sugarlands," Kephart gave a quasi-factual account of a North Carolina deputy's excursion into the Sugarlands to apprehend a fugitive. The deputy and his hodgepodge posse chased the fugitive across Sugarland Mountain to "Barradale's upper logging camp" on Rough Creek, although they failed to locate him. They returned to North Carolina empty-handed the following day.

George McCoy, writing in an early park guide in 1935, reported that the Sugarland Mountain Trail was "extremely rugged," but offered excellent views of Mount Le Conte. In 1937, Laura Thornborough— who wrote extensively of hiking trails in the Smokies— echoed McCoy's description, calling the Sugarland Mountain Trail "rugged and rough," but well worth an all-day trip.

== Trail synopsis ==
=== Fighting Creek Gap to Huskey Gap — 3.1 miles ===
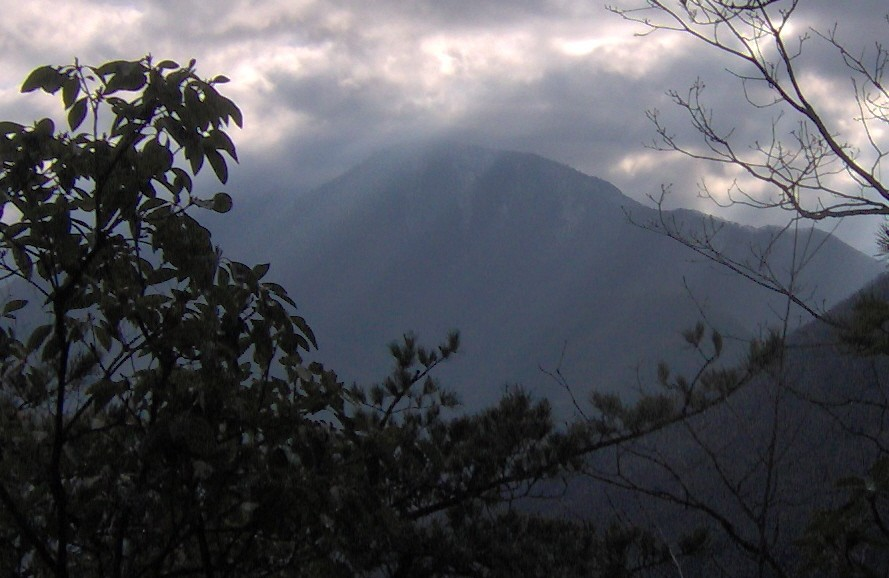
Mount Le Conte, viewed from a break in the foliage a mile or so from the trailhead

The first half-mile or so of the Sugarland Mountain Trail is uphill as the trail rises out of Fighting Creek Gap and winds its way around the eastern side of the mountain's northernmost knob. After descending to Mids Gap (an unmarked manway follows Mids Branch to the Elkmont Nature Trail, a mile or so to the west), the trail swings to the western slope of the mountain, where it winds its way up and around a second knob and gradually descends to Huskey Gap.

At Huskey Gap, the Sugarland Mountain Trail, which runs north-to-south, intersects the Huskey Gap Trail, which runs roughly east-to-west. The eastern half of the Huskey Gap Trail descends to Newfound Gap Road (U.S. Route 441), and continues as a "Quiet Walkway" to the ruins of the Sugarlands community along the banks of the West Fork of the Little Pigeon River. The western half of the Huskey Gap Trail descends to the Little River Trail and Little River, just upstream from Elkmont.

=== Huskey Gap to Rough Creek Trail junction — 4.2 miles ===
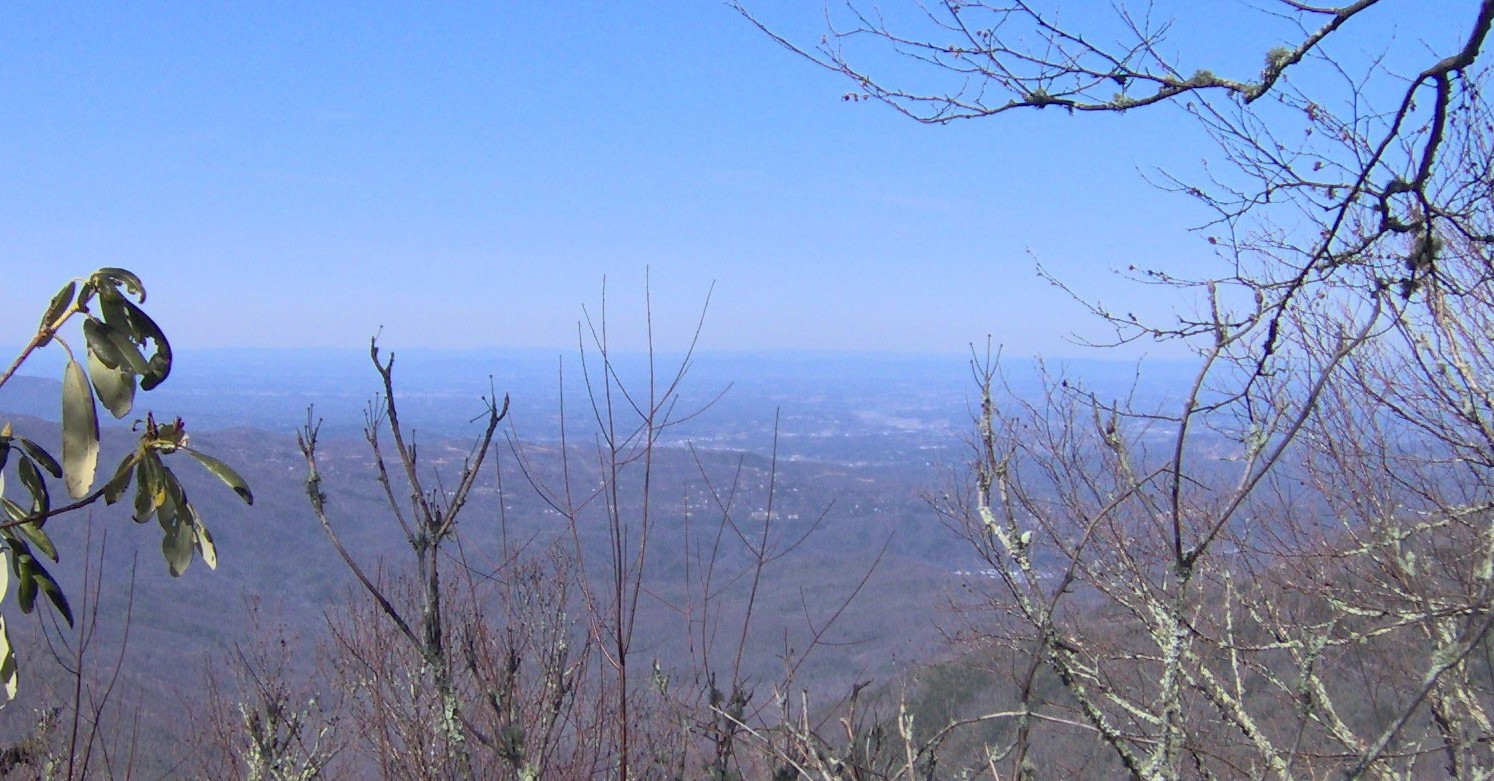
View of Sevier County from a backbone between the north peak and the Rough Creek Trail

The Huskey Gap-to-Rough Creek section of the Sugarland Mountain Trail is characterized by heaths and boulder fields as it winds its way around the western slope of Sugarland Mountain's 4,833-foot (1,473 m) northern peak. This peak comes into clear view as the trail enters its first substantial stand of heath immediately south of Huskey Gap.

As the trail begins to ascend the northern peak, it reenters a thick deciduous forest. The headwaters of various streams have cut a series of hollows into the western flank of this peak, leading down into the Little River Valley. These upper hollows are littered with boulders, which over the years have broken off from higher elevations and have been carried down into the streambeds by erosional forces. Backcountry Campsite 21 was formerly located amidst the first of these boulder fields in the headwaters of Big Medicine Branch prior to being relocated to the Huskey Gap Trail near the junction with Little River Trail.

Sandstone outcroppings are not uncommon along the steep western slope of the north peak. Approximately 1 mile (1.6 km) from the campsite, a pile of large rocks allows for an unobstructed view out over the Little River Valley westward to Miry Ridge and Blanket Mountain. Beyond the north peak, the trail traverses its first substantial backbone. Gatlinburg and Newfound Gap Road are visible through the treeline to the east.

=== Rough Creek Trail junction to Appalachian Trail — 4.8 miles ===
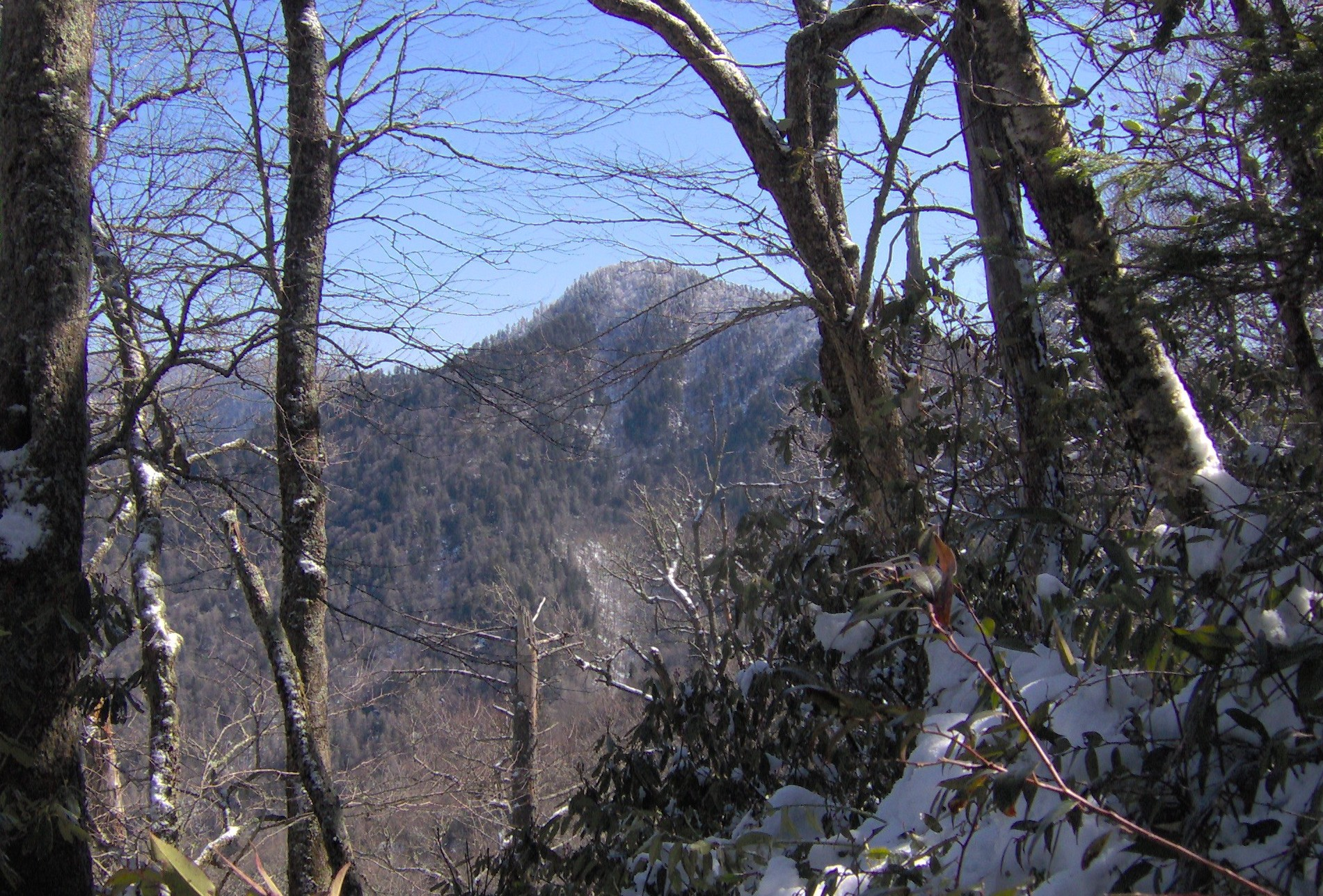
Mount Mingus, visible appx. 10 miles from the trailhead

The Rough Creek-to-Appalachian Trail segment of the Sugarland Mountain Trail is its most rugged and most strenuous. Most of the remainder of the trail consists of sharp ascents over steep ledges alternating with smooth strolls over narrow backbones. Approximately one mile of the lower section of trail was burned during the catastrophic wildfirefire that occurred in the area in November 2016. This portion of the trail is now overgrown with tall weeds and brambles in summertime. At just over 8 miles (13 km), a break in the foliage allows for an unobstructed view of the Rough Creek Valley below and Sweet Ridge and Miry Ridge in the distance to the northwest and west. Mount Le Conte dominates the view through the treeline to the east.

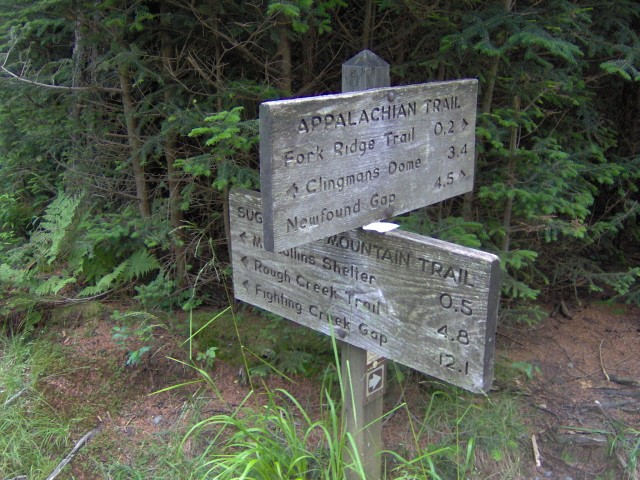
The Sugarland Mountain Trail terminus

Around 10 miles (16 km) from the trailhead, the Sugarland Mountain Trail passes just below the mountain's 5,494-foot (1,675 m) summit, which rises at the mountain's junction with Sweet Ridge. Beyond the summit, Mount Collins becomes visible through the treeline to the south, and Mount Mingus dominates the view to the east. After winding its way across Sugarland Mountain's upper elevations, the trail ascends sharply to the Mount Collins Shelter and the trail terminus along the Appalachian Trail.

West of the Sugarland Mountain Trail terminus, the Appalachian Trail continues to ascend sharply, crossing the 6,188-foot (1,886 m) summit of Mount Collins and continuing onward to Clingmans Dome. A small footpath east of the trail terminus leads to Clingmans Dome Road and the Fork Ridge Trail terminus on the other side of the road. Newfound Gap is approximately 4.5 miles (7.2 km) east of the trail terminus.

The Mount Collins Shelter is situated just off the Sugarland Mountain Trail approximately 0.3 miles (0.48 km) north of the trail's terminus at the Appalachian Trail. A spring— part of the headwaters of Moccasin Branch— provides the shelter's water source. The shelter— built of stone and enclosed by fencing at one end— is typical of Appalachian Trail shelters in the area.
