= Chimney Tops =

Mountain in Tennessee, US

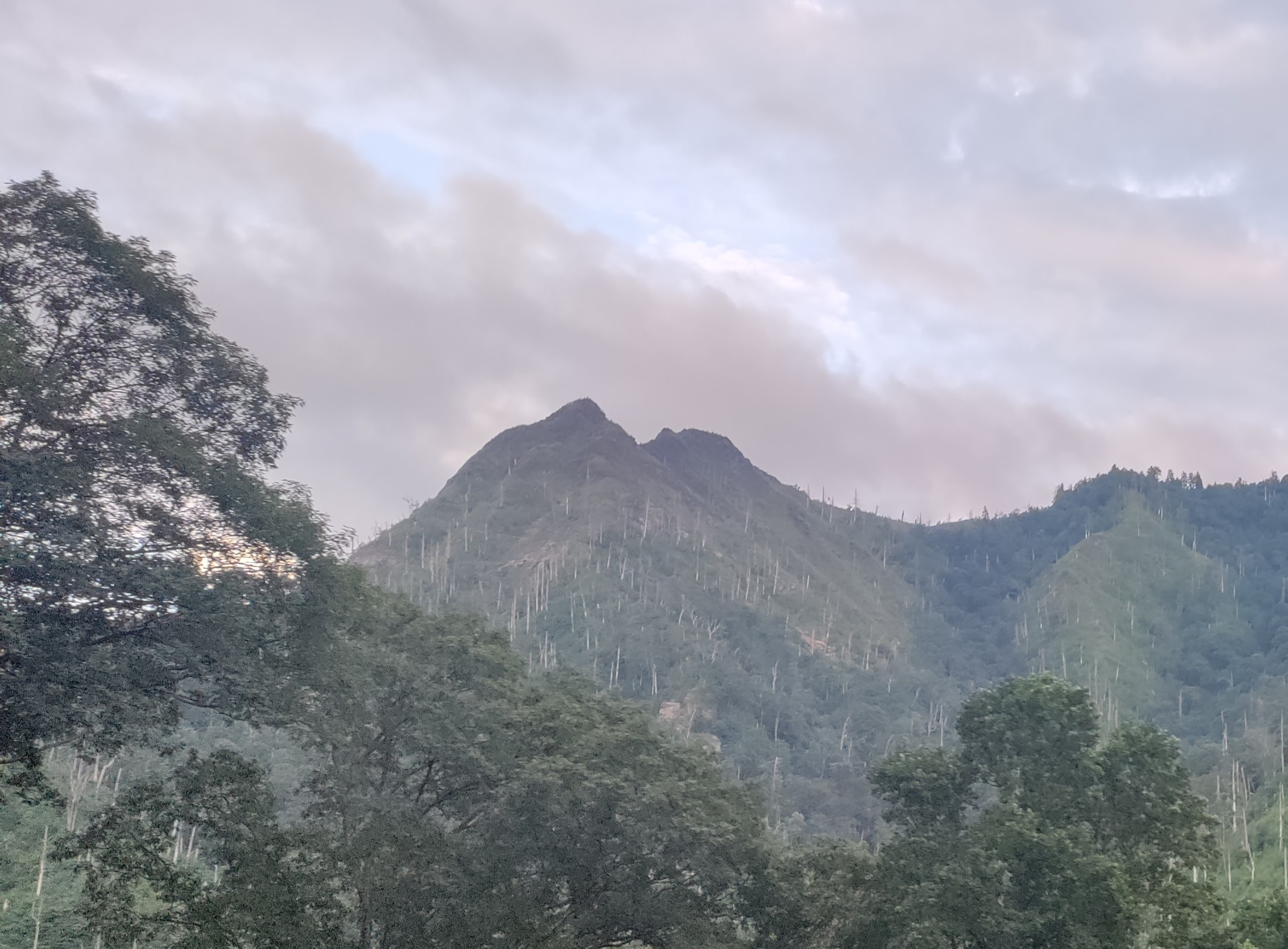
- Chimney Tops, looking south from Newfound Gap Road (US Route 441) in 2024.

Highest point
- Elevation: 4,724 ft (1,440 m) NAVD 88
- Prominence: 120 ft (37 m)
- Coordinates: region:US-TN scale:100000 source:NPS 35°37′50″N 83°28′42″W

Geography
- Location: Sevier County, Tennessee
- Parent range: Great Smoky Mountains
- Topo map: NPS "Mount Le Conte" (PDF).

Climbing
- Easiest route: Chimney Tops Trail, short climb

Chimney Tops is a mountain in the central Great Smoky Mountains in Tennessee. It is 4,724 feet (1,440 m) above sea level. Chimney Tops is a double-capstone knob on the eastern slope of the Sugarland Mountain massif, which stretches north-south across the north-central section of the Smokies. Mount Le Conte rises to the east and Mt. Mingus to the southeast, almost encircling Chimney Tops, but the view from its summit is 360 degrees.

== Geology ==
Chimney Tops is one of the few instances of a bare rock summit in the Smokies. The rock atop the mountain has been exposed to natural weathering. The bedrock is mostly Anakeesta Formation metamorphic rock, especially slate, phyllite, and metasiltstone. It was formed 200 million years ago when the North American and African plates collided during the Appalachian orogeny.

== History ==
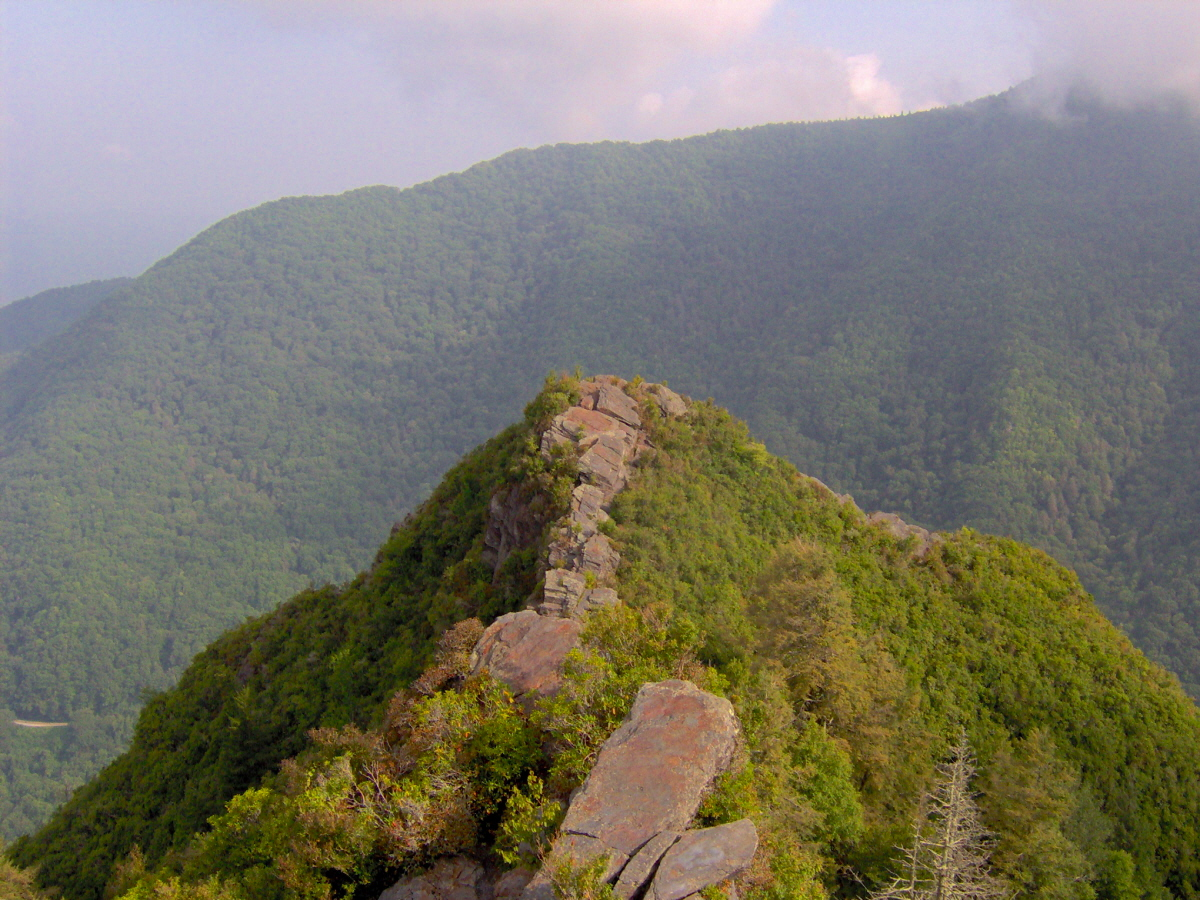
The lower capstone of Chimney Tops, looking north from the higher capstone, as seen in 2006.

The Cherokee name for Chimney Tops is Duniskwalgunyi, or "forked antler", referring to its resemblance to the deer antlers. In the Cherokee legend "Aganunitsi and the Uktena", the captured medicine man, Aganunitsi, in order to free himself, searches remote parts of the Smokies to find the giant reptile, the Uktena, and seize an amulet from its forehead. In his quest, Aganunitsi searches distant gaps and peaks in the Smokies before going to Duniskwalgunyi, the Gap of the Forked Antler, and to the lake of Atagahi, and at each found monstrous reptiles.

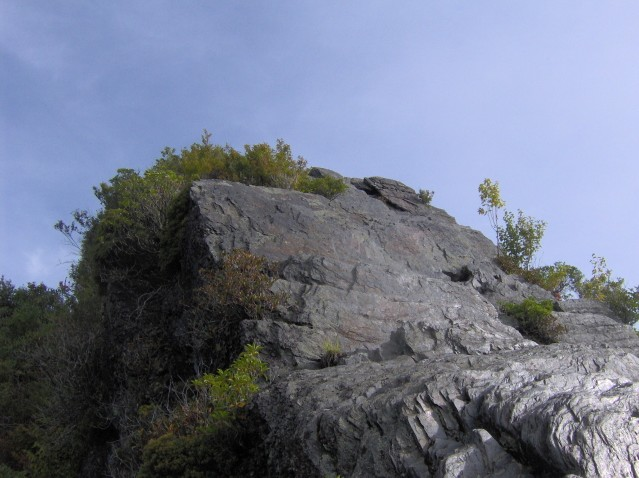
Folded metamorphic rock characterizes the capstones of Chimney Tops.

The Road Prong Trail, which follows the stream of the same name at the base of Chimney Tops, is one of the oldest trails in the Smokies. In the 18th and 19th centuries, the ancient path was known commonly as the Indian Gap Trail. In 1832, the Oconaluftee Turnpike was constructed between Indian Gap and Smokemont. The road was expanded during the Civil War by Cherokee leader Col. Will Thomas, running parallel to the modern trail.

The mountain's current name was probably given to it by residents of the Sugarlands, a valley to the north of the mountain that was home to a small Appalachian community before the Great Smoky Mountains National Park was formed. Before the Sugarlands was reforested, Chimney Tops was clearly visible from most of the valley. Local legend even suggested that the top of the mountain was covered in soot.

== Access ==
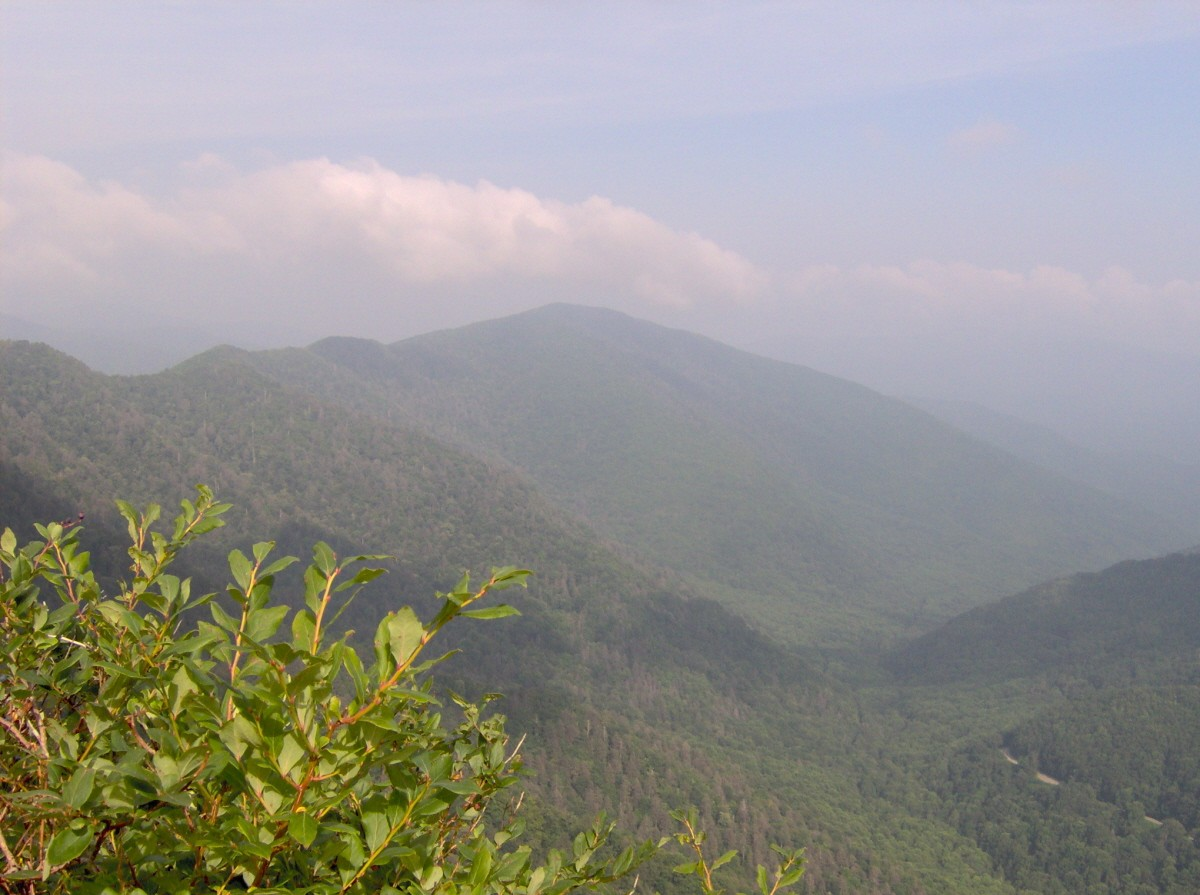
Sugarland Mountain, looking northwest from the summit of Chimney Tops in 2006.

A common route to closely see the peaks is the Chimney Tops Trail, which can be accessed about 6.9 miles southeast of the Sugarlands Visitor Center on Newfound Gap Road. Another route follows the Appalachian Trail west from Newfound Gap to the Road Prong Trail. The Road Prong Trail, following the stream at the base of the mountain, connects the Appalachian Trail with the Chimney Tops Trail. This route is twice as long as the route from the Chimney Tops parking lot.

From the summit, Mount Le Conte and Mount Kephart can be seen in the east, Sugarland Mountain in the west, and the Sugarlands valley in the north. A severe fire in 2016 led to closure of many trails in the Great Smoky Mountains, including in the Chimney Tops area. The trail reopened in October 2017, with a new observation area that offers a place to view both of the bare rock points of the summit. However, the extreme heat of the fires resulted in accelerated weathering and potential mass wasting of the exposed rock, and therefore access to the summit is no longer permitted for safety reasons.
