= Mount Mingus =

Mountain in Tennessee, United States

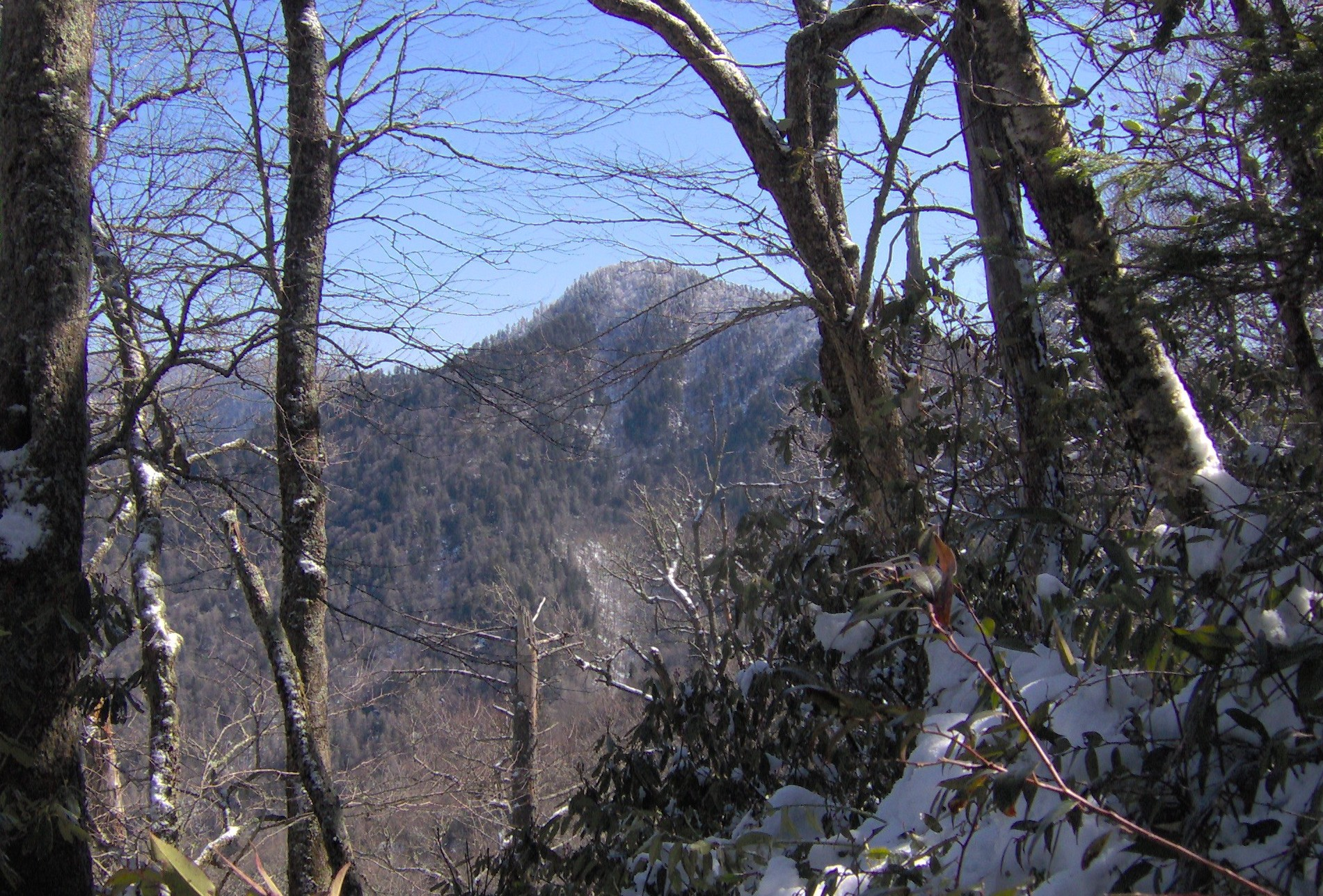
- Mount Mingus from the Sugarland Mountain Trail

Highest point
- Elevation: 5,802 ft (1,768 m)
- Prominence: 528 ft (161 m)
- Coordinates: 35°37′4″N 83°27′33″W

Geography
- Location: Sevier County, Tennessee
- Parent range: Appalachian Mountains, Blue Ridge Mountains, Great Smoky Mountains
- Topo map: USGS Mount Mingus

Climbing
- First ascent: unknown
- Easiest route: Hike

Mount Mingus is a mountain located in the Great Smoky Mountains National Park in the U.S. state of Tennessee. It is part of the Great Smoky Mountains subrange of the Blue Ridge Mountains, which is, in turn, part of the Appalachian Mountains. Its elevation is 5,802 feet (1,768 m) above sea level.

== Description ==
The summit of Mount Mingus is a rounded knob that reaches an elevation of 5,802 feet (1,768 m) above mean sea level. It is located about 1 mile (1.6 km) south of Newfound Gap Road (U.S. Route 441), the main thoroughfare through the national park, 1 mile (1.6 km) from the Tennessee-North Carolina state line and the Appalachian Trail, and 2 miles (3.2 km) west of Newfound Gap. It is also located east-southeast of the Sugarland Mountain massif, about 2.5 miles (4.0 km) south of the summit of Mount Le Conte, and about 2 miles (3.2 km) north-northeast of Mount Collins.
