= The Sugarlands =

Valley in the north-central Great Smoky Mountains

Coordinates: 35°41′08″N 83°32′11″W

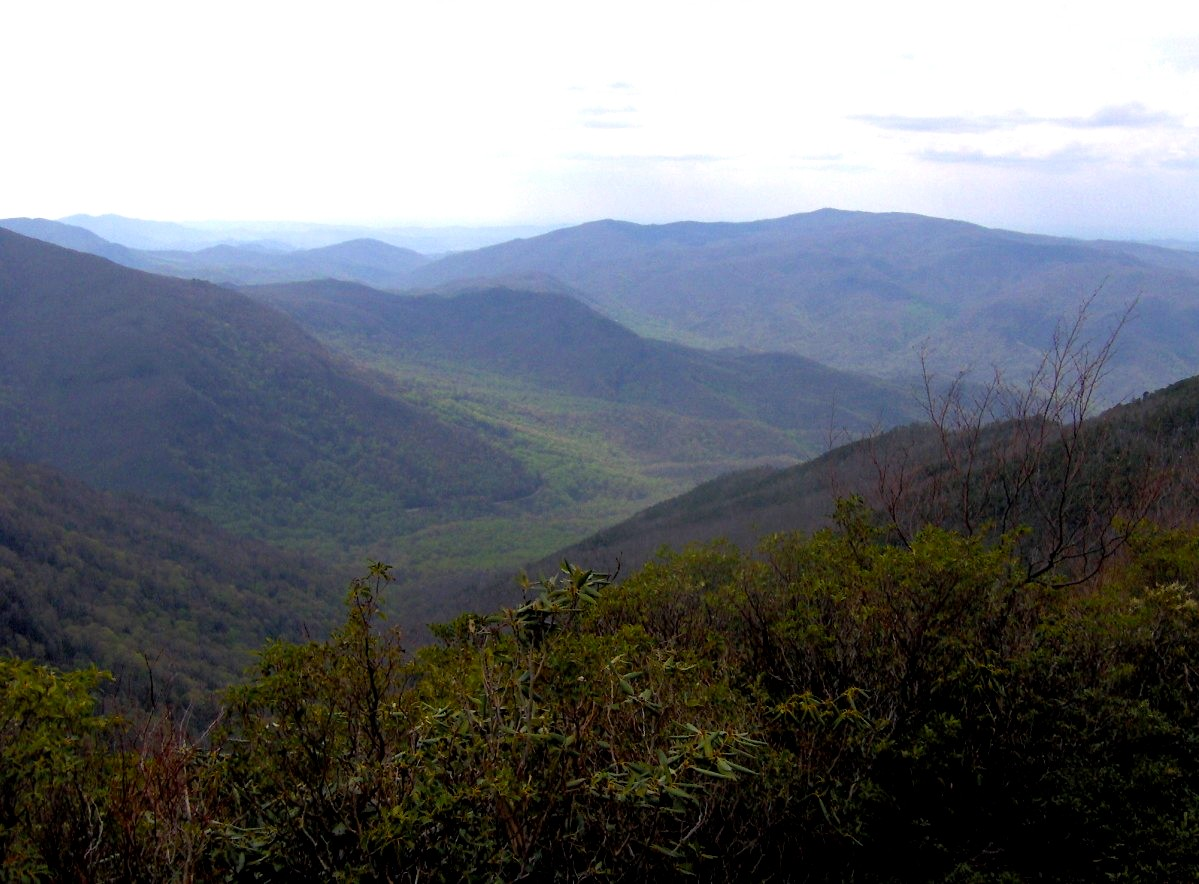
The Sugarlands, looking northwest from Bull Head.

The Sugarlands is a valley in Tennessee within the north-central Great Smoky Mountains, located in the southeastern United States. Formerly home to a string of small Appalachian communities, the valley is now the location of the Great Smoky Mountains National Park headquarters and the Sugarlands Visitor Center. Lying just south of Gatlinburg, the Sugarlands is one of the park's most popular access points.

The Sugarlands area stretches roughly from Grapeyard Ridge and Roaring Fork in the east to the slopes of Sugarland Mountain to the west. Mount Le Conte rises 5,000 feet (1,500 m) above the valley to the south and southeast. The West Fork of the Little Pigeon River, its source high in the mountains, passes through the Sugarlands, draining much of the valley.

When the first Euro-American settlers arrived in the early 19th century, they named the valley after the many sugar maple trees growing in the area at the time. Syrup was made from the sap in these trees and used as a sweetener in the days before the availability of cane sugar. While these trees were cleared by the early settlers, the sugar maple is still common throughout the park.

== Geology ==
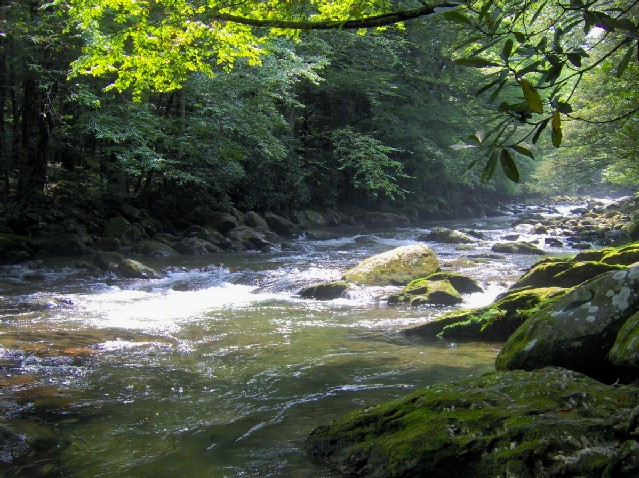
The West Fork of the Little Pigeon River in the Sugarlands.

The Sugarlands is underlain by a Precambrian sandstone of the Ocoee Supergroup, known specifically as Roaring Fork sandstone. This rock, like other formations throughout the Appalachian region, was formed from ancient ocean sediments nearly one billion years ago. Erosional forces throughout the Mesozoic and Cenozoic eras—especially during the last ice age—have carried rocks of various sizes down from boulder fields high up on the surrounding mountain slopes, leaving the valley coated with a bouldery alluvium. Early farmers, having to move these rocks in order plant crops, stacked them up to make crude stone walls, many of which remain today.

== History ==
In Cherokee lore, the Sugarlands was part of the area known as "Walasi'yi", or "Frog place". Walasi'yi included Mount Le Conte and Bull Head, as well as "the ridge extending into Sevier County, Tennessee, between the Middle and West forks of Little Pigeon River." In the legend "Aganunitsi and the Uktena," the Shawano medicine man, Aganunitsi, in exchange for his freedom, seeks out the great serpent, Uktena, in hopes of snatching a magical jewel from its forehead. After searching the surrounding mountains, Aganunitsi found his way to Walasi'yi:

Going still south to Walasi'yi, the Frog place, he found a great frog squatting in the gap, but when the people who came to see it were frightened like the others and ran away from the monster he mocked at them for being afraid of a frog and went on to the next gap.

=== Early pioneers ===
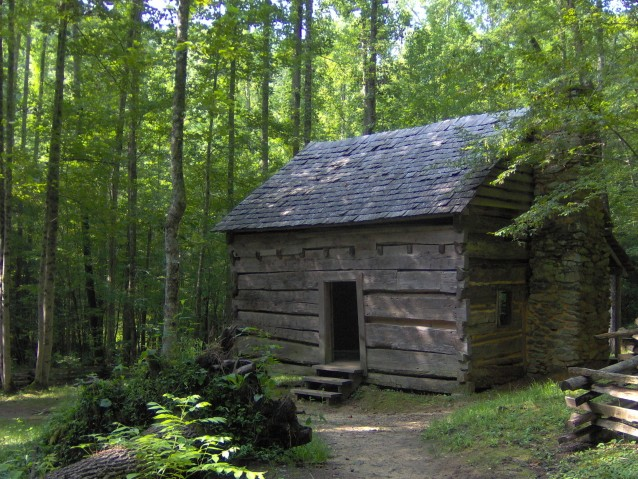
John Ownby Cabin, built in 1860

The first European settlers arrived in the area around 1800, settling in the vicinity of what would eventually become Gatlinburg. Richard Reagan and William "Black Bill" Ogle—children of these early settlers—farmed land along Mill Creek (now LeConte Creek) in the eastern half of the Sugarlands. William Trentham homesteaded in the Fighting Creek area, where the Sugarlands Visitor Center now stands. In subsequent decades, three communities developed in the Sugarlands valley—the Forks-of-the-River and Fighting Creek communities in the vicinity of what is now the Sugarlands Visitor Center, and the Sugarlands community proper, which lay further to the south, between the two "Quiet Walkways" opposite the Huskey Gap Trail and the Chimney picnic area. Most of the inhabitants still living in the Sugarlands when the park was formed were descended from these early settlers.

For much of the 19th century, Sugarlanders lived in log cabins. The typical mountain cabin consisted of one room, 16' × 20', constructed of notched logs and puncheon floors. A chimney, usually made of slate and clay, rose along one wall. A lone window was on the wall opposite the chimney. Around 1900, modern frame houses slowly started replacing the log cabins.

A standard farm in the Sugarlands consisted of the cabin or house and a small vegetable garden, all of which was surrounded by a paling fence, and several outbuildings. A smokehouse and woodshed would likely be found near the kitchen, and a springhouse would straddle a nearby spring. Other likely outbuildings included barns, corn cribs (often affixed to the barns), chicken coops, and toolsheds. There were at least five gristmills in the Sugarlands, the largest belonging to Caleb Trentham. The tubwheel-powered mill of Noah "Bud" Ogle still stands today at Cherokee Orchard.

=== Civil War ===
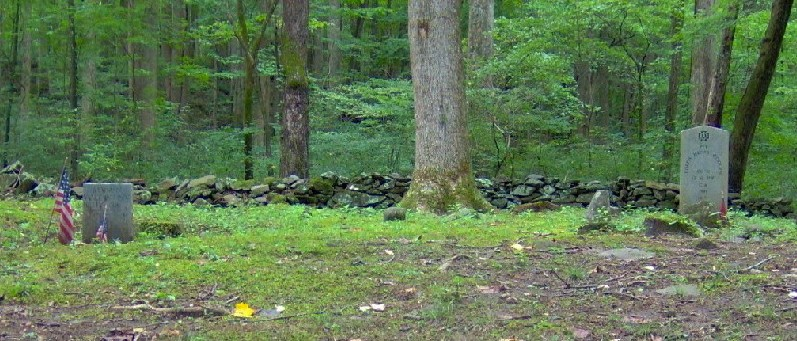
Cole Cemetery, with a Union supporter buried near a Confederate soldier

Like much of southern Appalachia, the U.S. Civil War proved devastating for the Sugarlands. The mountain communities of East Tennessee (most of which were pro-Union) were especially vulnerable, as they were easy targets for Confederate raiders from North Carolina. During the war, Will Thomas—a Confederate colonel and later Cherokee chief—made improvements to the Oconaluftee Turnpike to allow Confederate marauders easier access to Sevier County. The Sugarlands would have been among the first communities approached along this road heading north from Chimney Tops.

Early in the war, Thomas' forces ascended the turnpike and occupied Gatlinburg. Thomas erected a small fort on Burg Hill in hopes of protecting salt peter mines at Alum Cave, along the northern slopes of Mount Le Conte. He was forced to withdraw, however, when a Union relief force threatened to surround the fort.

=== Late 19th and early 20th centuries ===
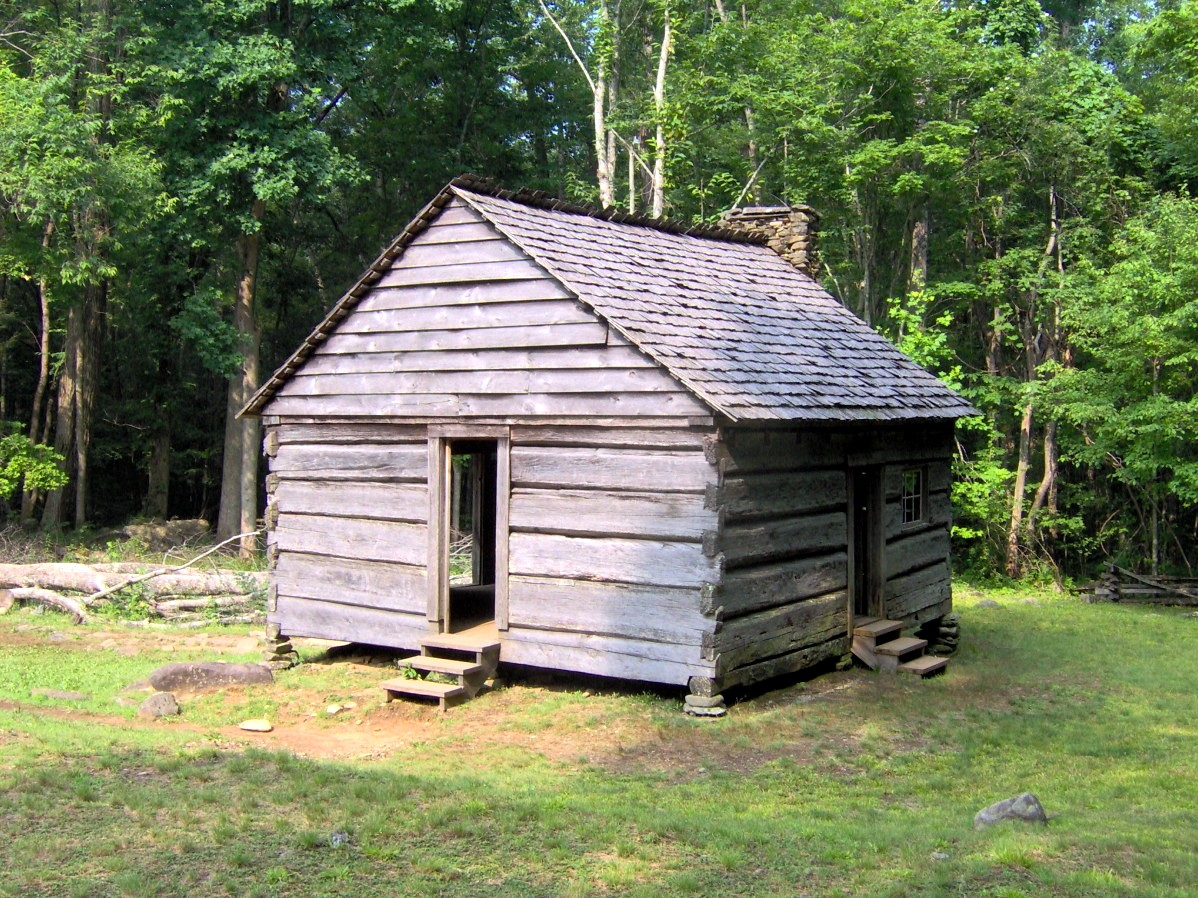
The Alex Cole Cabin, formerly located in the Sugarlands, now situated along the Roaring Fork Motor Nature Trail

As small farms in the Sugarlands recovered from the Civil War, some began growing enough excess crops to sell or trade. The more prosperous farmers opened small general stores, which were often located in the store owner's house or a room attached to the house. The stores sold flour, meal, meat, soda, salt, coffee, tobacco, snuff, and castor oil. The stores also bought (or traded for) chickens, eggs, honey, ginseng, and furs, which the store owner would take to Sevierville or Knoxville to trade. Sugarlanders who lived near fords of the Pigeon River had the most lucrative storefronts. Among them were Richard Reason Reagan (1830–1912), who owned a general store near the Sugarland Branch ford, and Alex Cole, who operated a storefront further up the river.

Around 1900, sawmills began moving into the area to harvest the thick forests of the Smokies. Andrew Huff had erected a sawmill in Gatlinburg, and the Little River Lumber Company began operating in the upper reaches of Little River by 1908. Many Sugarlanders found employment with the latter in Elkmont, which could be reached on foot by crossing Sugarland Mountain via what is now the Huskey Gap Trail. Bark from trees cut in the Sugarlands was often used for tanning.

Poverty plagued much of Appalachia in the early 20th century, and the Sugarlands was no exception. Former resident Alie Newman Maples recalled in a poem:

The Sugarlands so clear and clean,
Altho our meals were mighty lean.

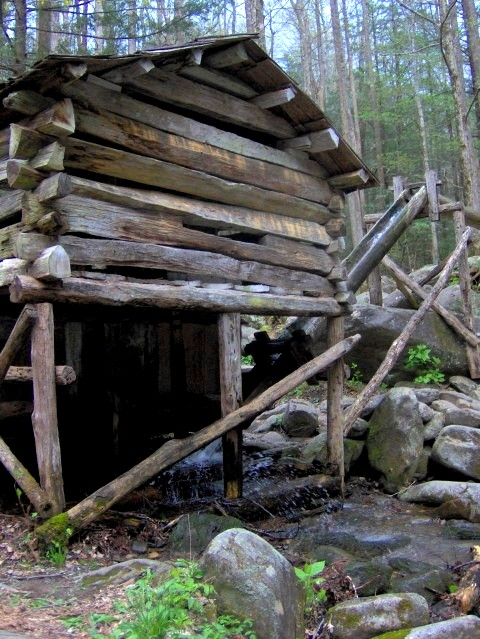
Tub mill near the Noah Ogle Place

In 1912, the Pi Beta Phi women's fraternity established the Pi Beta Phi settlement school in Gatlinburg to combat poverty in the area. The early Pi Phi teachers' scrapbooks and letters recalled the region's sub-par conditions. One remarked that the Sugarlands was a "land of poorer homes" than even Gatlinburg, which was selected for the settlement school as the community most in need. Another recalled a dining experience with a family in the Sugarlands where the food was served on "large pail lids" while chickens roamed freely through the house. Some of the area children did not know simple childhood games, and others knew nothing about Christmas. Regardless, building on the initial successes of the Gatlinburg school, the Pi Phis decided to open a school in the Sugarlands in 1920. The school was located near the old Ransom Sims place, in the vicinity of the Sugarlands Cemetery. While the Sugarlanders were initially suspicious of the Pi Phis' intentions, they eventually welcomed the benefits of the settlement school. Its presence allowed children in Gatlinburg and the Sugarlands to get a basic education and helped to improve the health and economy of the area.

=== Moonshining ===
By 1900, moonshining had become rampant throughout the Smokies. The dense forest, isolated coves, and ready availability of corn made mountain valleys such as the Sugarlands the perfect places to hide and operate illegal stills. Horace Kephart, a writer who lived on the North Carolina side of the mountains in the early 20th century, described the Sugarlands during this period:

...a country of ill fame, hidden deep in remote gorges, difficult of access, tenanted by a sparse population who preferred to be a law unto themselves. For many a year it had been known on our side as Blockaders' Glory, which is the same as saying Moonshiners' Paradise, and we all believed it to be fitly named.

Kephart goes on to give a quasi-factual account of a North Carolina deputy's raid into the Sugarlands to find three fugitives. Kephart describes a cornfield planted on a slope "so steep that it must have been dug with mattocks and hoed on hands and knees." The residents, while polite, seemed very suspicious of the outsiders, offering no information on the three fugitives and refusing overnight lodging. The party eventually found a house to take them in for the night but returned to North Carolina empty-handed.

While moonshining no doubt occurred, Kephart's account is probably exaggerated. Gladys Trentham Russell, who grew up in the Fighting Creek area, estimated that less than 20% of mountain families ever engaged in the practice. Those who consumed moonshine often did so for medicinal purposes. Russell did acknowledge, however, that "bootleggers" and "bad men" made the far reaches of the Sugarlands too dangerous for women and children.

=== National park ===
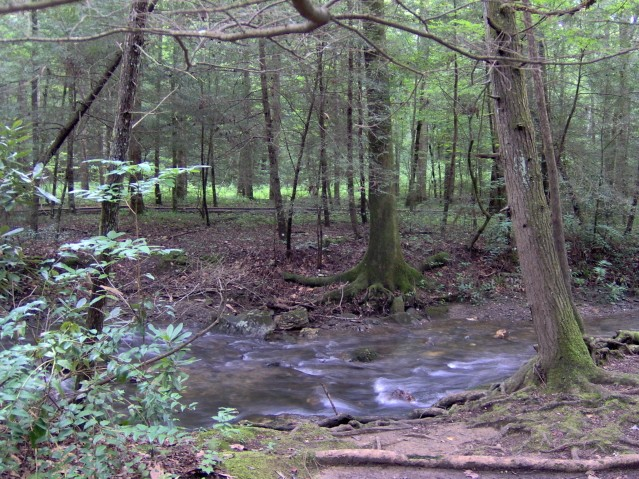
Fighting Creek

In the 19the century, mountain areas became popular vacation destinations, especially since large urban areas were often wanting for clean air and scenery. Mineral-rich mountain springs were thought to have health-restoring qualities, and the cool air of the higher elevations lured people seeking relief from allergies and hay fever. Colonel W. B. Townsend, the owner of the Little River Lumber Company, began to see the value of creating recreational areas on land that had already been stripped of its wood. In 1909, after the Elkmont area had largely been cleared, the company's train, the Little River Railroad, began offering daily train service from Knoxville to Elkmont in conjunction with Knoxville's Southern Railroad. Tourists also began pouring into Gatlinburg, especially after Andrew Huff opened the Mountain View Hotel in 1916. With the arrival of tourism, Sugarlanders found a wider market for their furs and produce.

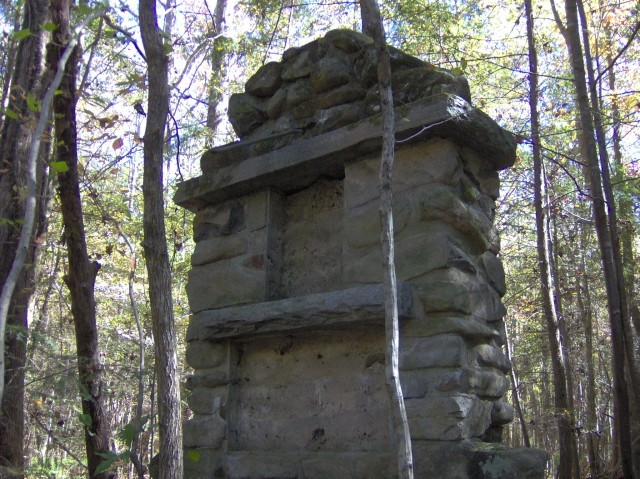
Sugarlands CCC Camp ruins

During this period, many Sugarlanders became legendary as mountain guides. Wiley Oakley (1885–1954), the most famous of these guides, lived on the northern slopes of Mount Le Conte in an area known as the Scratch Britches (now traversed by the Rainbow Falls Trail). Known as the "Roamin' Man of the Mountains," Oakley's navigational instincts and extensive knowledge of area plant and animal life and oral traditions would later prove invaluable to park service scientists and anthropologists.

When various entities began buying up land for the national park in the 1920s and 1930s, most of the inhabitants of the Sugarlands were displaced. Russell recalls:

Most folks were happy with the prospects of selling their rocky fields and hillsides for more money than they estimated it to be worth, but some felt they didn't want to be driven from their old homeplaces at any price.

While most Sugarlanders accepted buy-out offers, a few had to be forced out via condemnation suits. Shortly after the formation of the park, the Civilian Conservation Corps constructed a camp along the West Fork which operated from 1933 to 1942, building roads and trails in the area for the park service. The ruins of this camp remain along a bend in the Old Sugarlands Trail. The closing of the CCC camp after World War II was the end of permanent human habitation in the Sugarlands. The forest quickly reclaimed the farmland, and other than a few small mountain cemeteries and the occasional odd clearing or pile of stones, few signs of the former inhabitants remain today.

== Present day ==
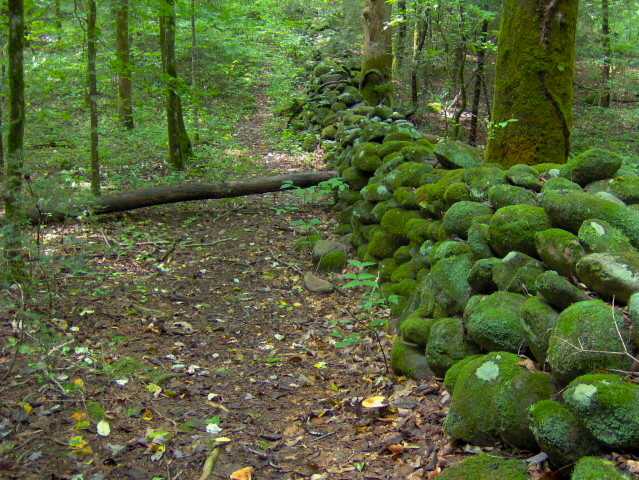
A crude property wall in the Sugarlands

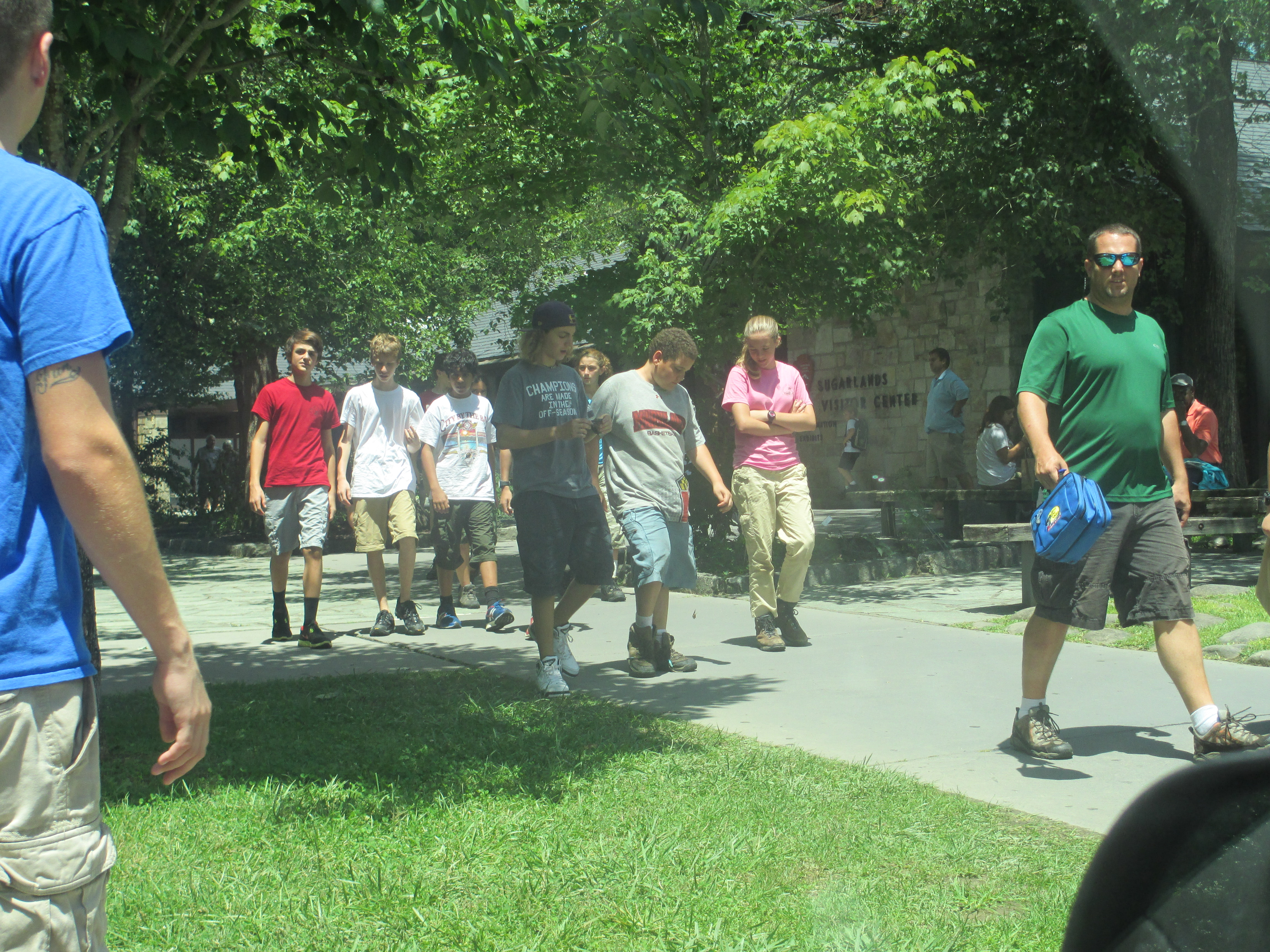
Tourists at Sugarlands Visitor Center near the Gatlinburg entrance to the park

The park's two main paved roads—Fighting Creek Gap Road and Newfound Gap Road (US-441)—intersect at the Sugarlands Visitor Center. From this intersection, it is approximately 25 miles to Cades Cove in the western Smokies, 22 miles to Newfound Gap, and 34 miles to Cherokee, North Carolina. Gatlinburg is two miles to the north.

=== Hiking trails ===
The Old Sugarlands Trail, which is both a hiking and horse trail, connects the Fighting Creek area along Newfound Gap Road with the Cherokee Orchard area. The Bullhead Trail branches off from the Old Sugarlands Trail, crossing the slopes of Bull Head before intersecting The Boulevard Trail atop Mount Le Conte. The Huskey Gap Trail, with its trailhead along Newfound Gap Road a mile past the visitors center, ascends Sugarland Mountain to the Sugarland Mountain Trail. Both the Boulevard Trail and Sugarland Mountain Trail intersect the Appalachian Trail along the crest of the Smokies to the south.

Two short trails labelled "Quiet Walkways" connect Newfound Gap Road with an area of stone ruins along the West Fork of the Little Pigeon River. An interpretive loop trail behind the Sugarlands Visitor Center leads past the John Ownby Cabin and the ruins of the Noah McCarter place. Cherokee Orchard Road connects US-441 in Gatlinburg to the Cherokee Orchard and Roaring Fork areas, and passes by the Noah Ogle homestead and the eastern head of the Old Sugarlands Trail.

== Historical structures ==
The Noah Ogle Place at the northeastern fringe of the valley, the John Ownby Cabin near the Sugarland Visitor Center, and the Alex Cole Cabin now at Roaring Fork are the last remaining extant building from the valley's pre-park communities. Various stone foundations, chimney falls, and crude rock walls remain scattered throughout the valley, giving hints of the layout of the early Appalachian settlements. The farmland, however, has been almost wholly reclaimed by hardwood forest.

=== John Ownby Cabin ===
Built in 1860, the John Ownby Cabin is the last surviving structure from the pre-park Forks-of-the-River community. Repaired in 1964, it was added to the National Register of Historic Places in 1976.

=== Noah Ogle Place ===
The Noah Ogle Place, located along LeConte Creek just south of Gatlinburg, consists of a cabin, barn, and tub mill that were once part of the homestead of Noah "Bud" Ogle (1863–1913). The cabin is a "saddlebag" cabin, a design in which two cabins are built around the same chimney, with both cabins consisting of one story and loft. Ogle's barn is the last remaining four-pen barn in the park, consisting of four 11 feet (3.4 m) by 11 feet (3.4 m) pens. Ogle's tub mill, one of the park's two surviving tub mills (the other is at the Alfred Reagan Place at Roaring Fork), consists of a millhouse connected via vertical shaft to a tubwheel turbine. An 80-foot (24 m) flume diverts water from LeConte Creek to power the mill.

=== Alex Cole Cabin ===
The Alex Cole Cabin was originally located on the east bank of the West Fork of Little Pigeon River along the old Indian Gap Road (the "Quiet Walkway" opposite the Huskey Gap Trailhead along Newfound Gap Road follows this road along the river's west bank), but was later moved to the Jim Bales Place along the Roaring Motor Nature Trail a few miles to the east. Like many Sugarlanders, Albert Alexander "Alex" Cole (1870–1958) and his sons worked for the Little River Lumber Company at Elkmont, making a weekly trek across Sugarland Mountain via what is now the Huskey Gap Trail. During the tourism boom in subsequent decades, Cole was a much sought-after mountain guide due to his knowledge of the Mount Le Conte area.

=== Rock House ===
The "Rock House," as it is locally known, can be found along a moderately difficult and faint footpath extending roughly a half mile off of the Old Sugarlands Trail. This structure is of unknown origin, although it is likely linked to the CCC camp which was located about a mile away. The Rock House is a stone structure consisting of two rooms and containing artifacts from its time in use. Broken bottles, bed frames, and an old camp stove remain within. The house was not noted in a 1931 USGS topographic map of the area, but does appear in a 1942 USGS topographic map. It has fallen into disrepair and should be explored with caution.
