= Mount Collins =

Mountain in North Carolina and Tennessee, USA

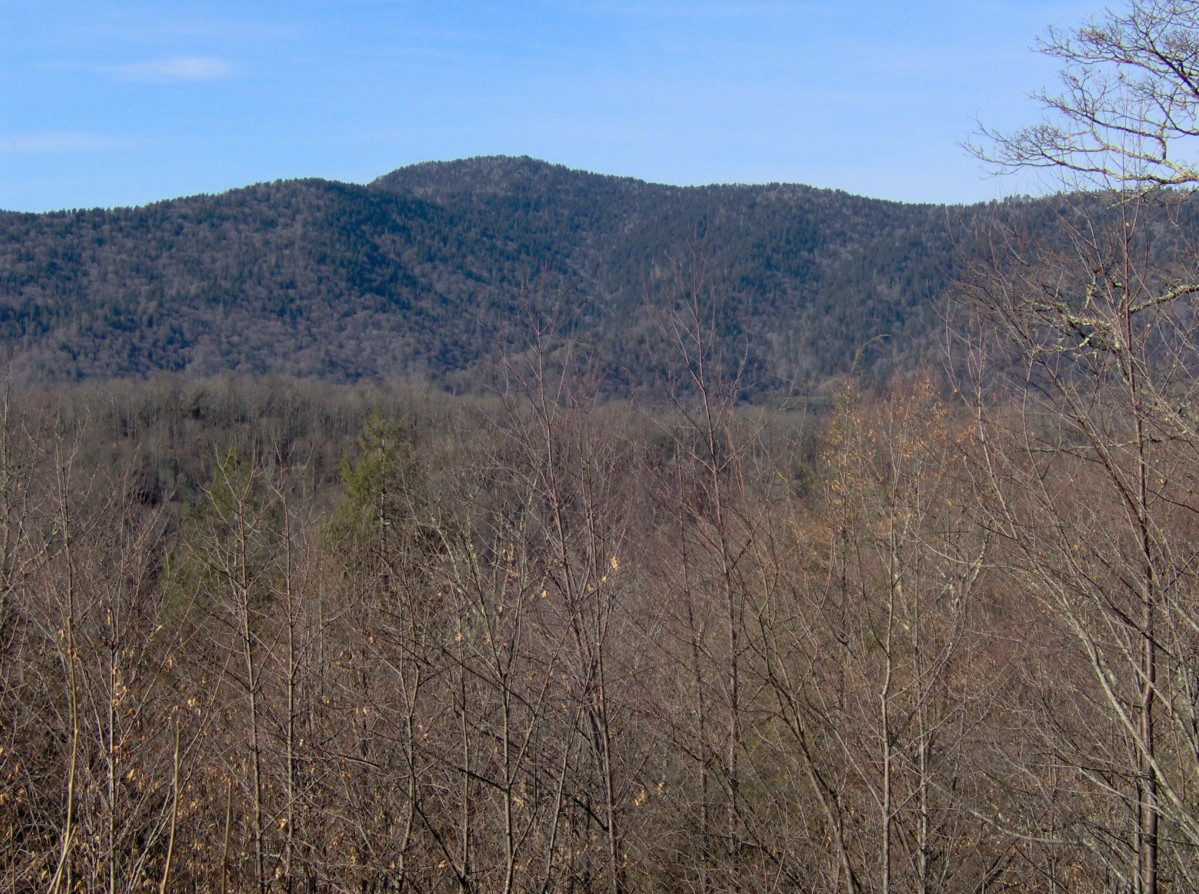
- Mount Collins, looking west from Newfound Gap Road

Highest point
- Elevation: 6,188 ft (1,886 m)
- Prominence: 470 feet (143 m)
- Coordinates: 35°35′12.51″N 83°28′20.56″W

Geography
- Location: Sevier County, Tennessee, U.S.; Swain County, North Carolina, U.S.
- Parent range: Great Smoky Mountains
- Topo map: USGS Clingmans Dome

Climbing
- Easiest route: Hike

Mount Collins is a mountain in the Great Smoky Mountains, located in the Southeastern United States. It has an elevation of 6,188 feet (1,886 m) above sea level. Located along the Appalachian Trail between Kuwohi and Newfound Gap, the mountain is a popular destination for thru-hikers. A backcountry shelter and a major trail junction are located along the mountain's northeastern slope. The mountain's summit is covered by a southern Appalachian spruce–fir forest.

== Description ==
Like most of the Smokies crest, Mount Collins is situated along the Tennessee-North Carolina border, with Sevier County to the north and Swain County to the south. The mountain rises approximately 4,000 feet (1,200 m) above its southeastern base near Bryson City and just over 3,000 feet (910 m) above its northwestern base near Meigs Post Prong. The mountain is the 25th-highest mountain in the Eastern United States, the 7th-highest in Tennessee, and the 10th-highest in the Great Smoky Mountains National Park.

The Sugarland Mountain massif—which rises in the Sugarlands and stretches nearly 10 miles (16 km) across the north-central section of the park—intersects the Smokies crest at the summit of Mount Collins. Two major watersheds—Little River and the West Fork of the Little Pigeon River—have their sources high on the mountain's northern slopes. The former flows down to Townsend and drains the northwestern Smokies before emptying into the Little Tennessee River. The latter drains the north-central section of the park, flowing through the Sugarlands en route to the French Broad River.

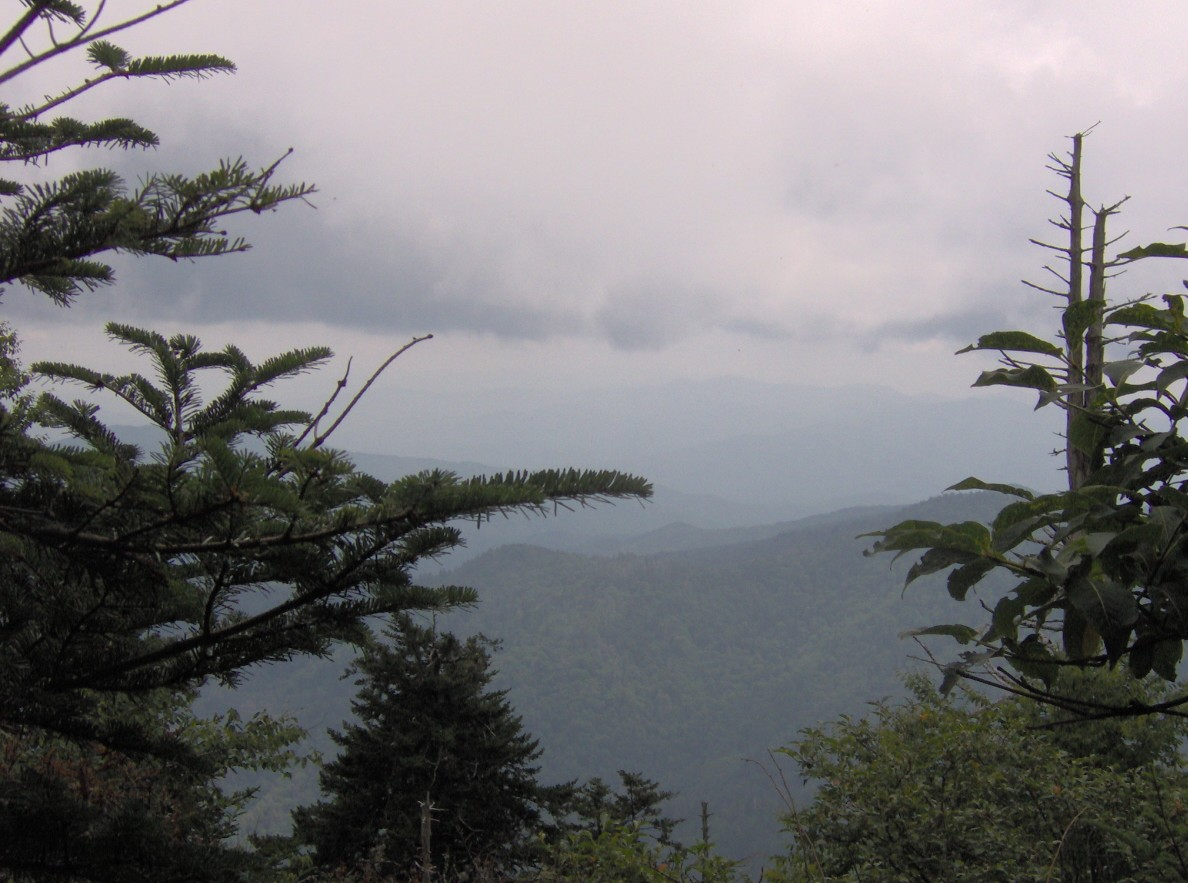
The view looking south from the Appalachian Trail, near the summit of Mount Collins

Mount Collins is named after Robert Collins, an Oconaluftee resident who guided Arnold Guyot across the crest of the Smokies in the late 1850s. In 1859, Guyot correctly measured the mountain's summit at 6,188 feet (1,886 m). While originally named "Mount Collins", the mountain was known as "Meigs Post" throughout the late-19th century and early-20th century after a station constructed by Return Meigs near its summit. In 1931, Horace Kephart requested the mountain be named for him, but after protests from Tennesseans (who favored their statesman Robert Collins over the North Carolinian Kephart), he settled on the mountain that now bears his name several miles to the east.

== Hiking trails ==
Several major trails intersect atop Mount Collins. The Appalachian Trail crosses the summit from southwest to northeast, with Kuwohi nearly 4 miles (6.4 km) to the west and Newfound Gap just over 3 miles (4.8 km) to the east. The Sugarland Mountain Trail intersects the Appalachian Trail a few hundred meters from the summit and connects the Smokies crest with the Sugarlands and Elkmont areas to the north. The Mountains-to-Sea Trail, which connects the crest of the Smokies with the Atlantic Ocean, also intersects the Appalachian Trail near the summit, just opposite the Sugarland Mountain Trail junction (this leg of the MST is called "Fork Ridge Trail" on park maps). The Noland Divide Trail descends Collins' south slope, connecting the Appalachian Trail to Bryson City.

All these trails can be accessed from Kuwohi Road, which is typically open between April 1 and December 1 (in winter, the A.T. can be accessed from U.S. Route 441 at Newfound Gap). The Mount Collins Shelter is located along the Sugarland Mountain Trail, a half-mile north of the Appalachian Trail junction. The shelter can accommodate 12 backpackers.
