= 2016 Great Smoky Mountains wildfires =

2016 wildfires that occurred in Sevier County, Tennessee, United States

2016 Great Smoky Mountains Wildfires
- Part of the 2016 Southeastern United States wildfires
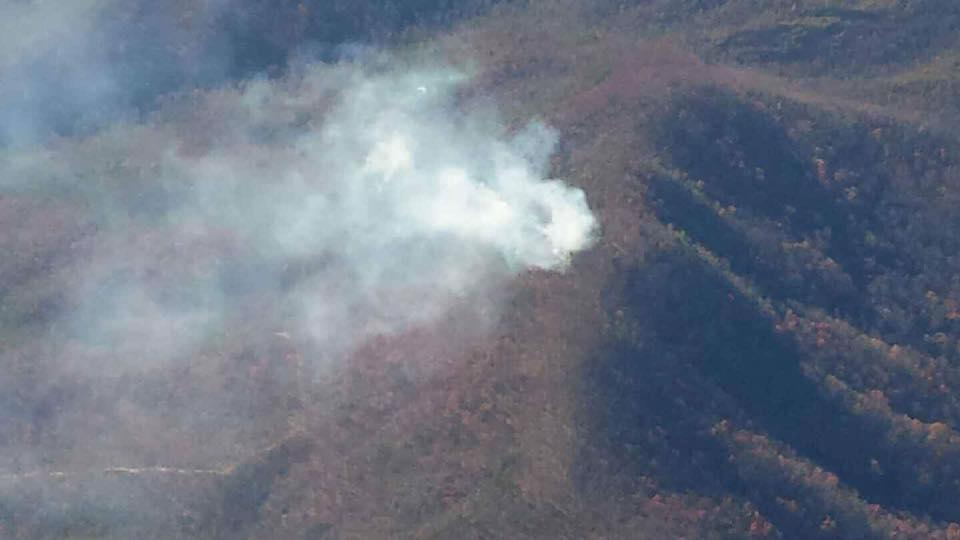
- Smoke from the Chimney Tops 2 Fire
- Date: November 23, 2016 – December 22, 2016
- Location: Great Smoky Mountains National Park, Sevier County, Tennessee, United States
- Coordinates: 35.6289763°N 83.478327°W

Statistics
- Burned area: 17,900 acres (72 km^{2})

Impacts
- Deaths: 14
- Injuries: Unknown
- Structures destroyed: 2,460 destroyed
- Cost: US$2 billion in damages

Ignition
- Cause: Arson
- Perpetrator: Two juveniles charged with aggravated arson
- Motive: Negligence

The 2016 Great Smoky Mountains wildfires, also known as the Gatlinburg wildfires, were a complex of wildfires which began in mid October 2016. Some of the towns most impacted were Pigeon Forge and Gatlinburg, both near Great Smoky Mountains National Park. The fires killed at least 14 people, injured 190, and were some of the largest arson-caused fires in the history of Tennessee.

By December 12, the fires had burned more than 10,000 acres (15 square miles) inside the national park, and 6,000 acres in other parts of the area. At least 14,000 area residents and tourists were forced to evacuate, while over 2,000 buildings were damaged and/or destroyed.

One of the largest wildfires was the Chimney Tops 2 Fire, which burned more than 10,000 acres, and closed the Chimney Tops Trail.

The Great Smoky Mountains wildfires were the deadliest wildfires in Tennessee, as well as the deadliest wildfires in the eastern U.S. since the Great Fires of 1947, which killed 16 people in Maine. In addition, the fires were also the deadliest and most destructive of the 2016 Southeastern United States wildfires.

American country singer and notable local resident Dolly Parton was among many notable figures to pitch in to assist victims.

== Progression ==
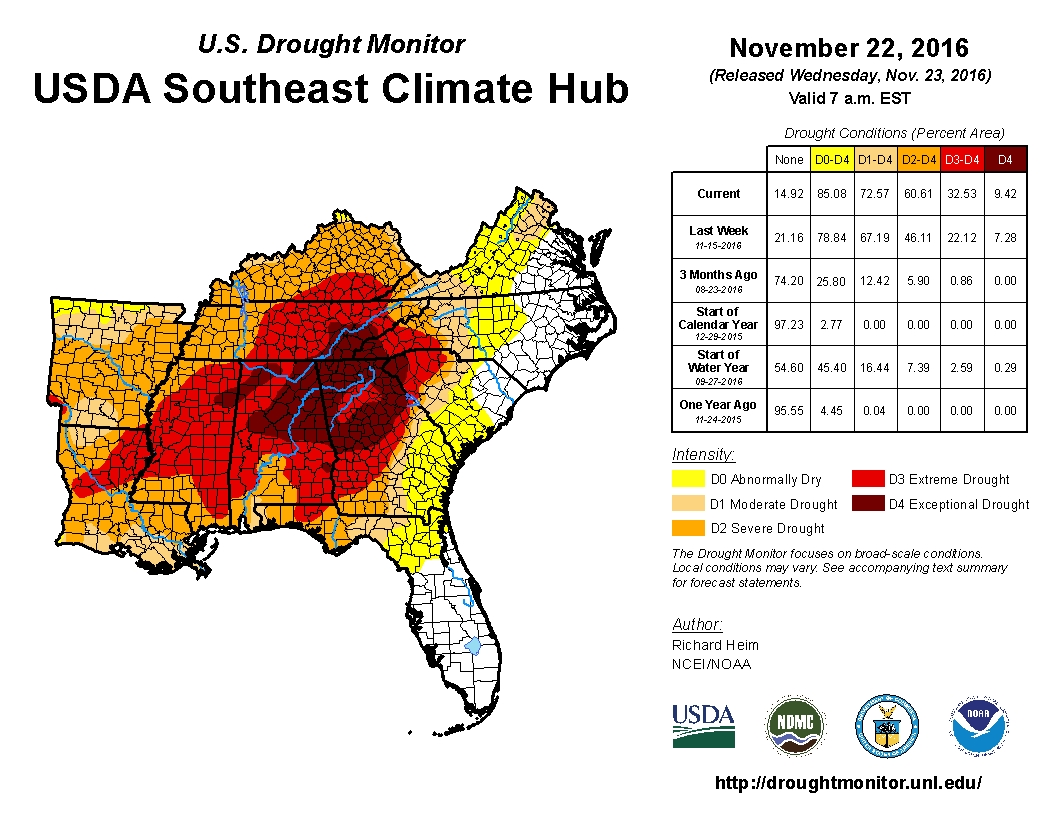
United States Drought Monitor image from November 22, 2016, showing exceptional drought across the Smoky Mountains of east Tennessee and southwest North Carolina.

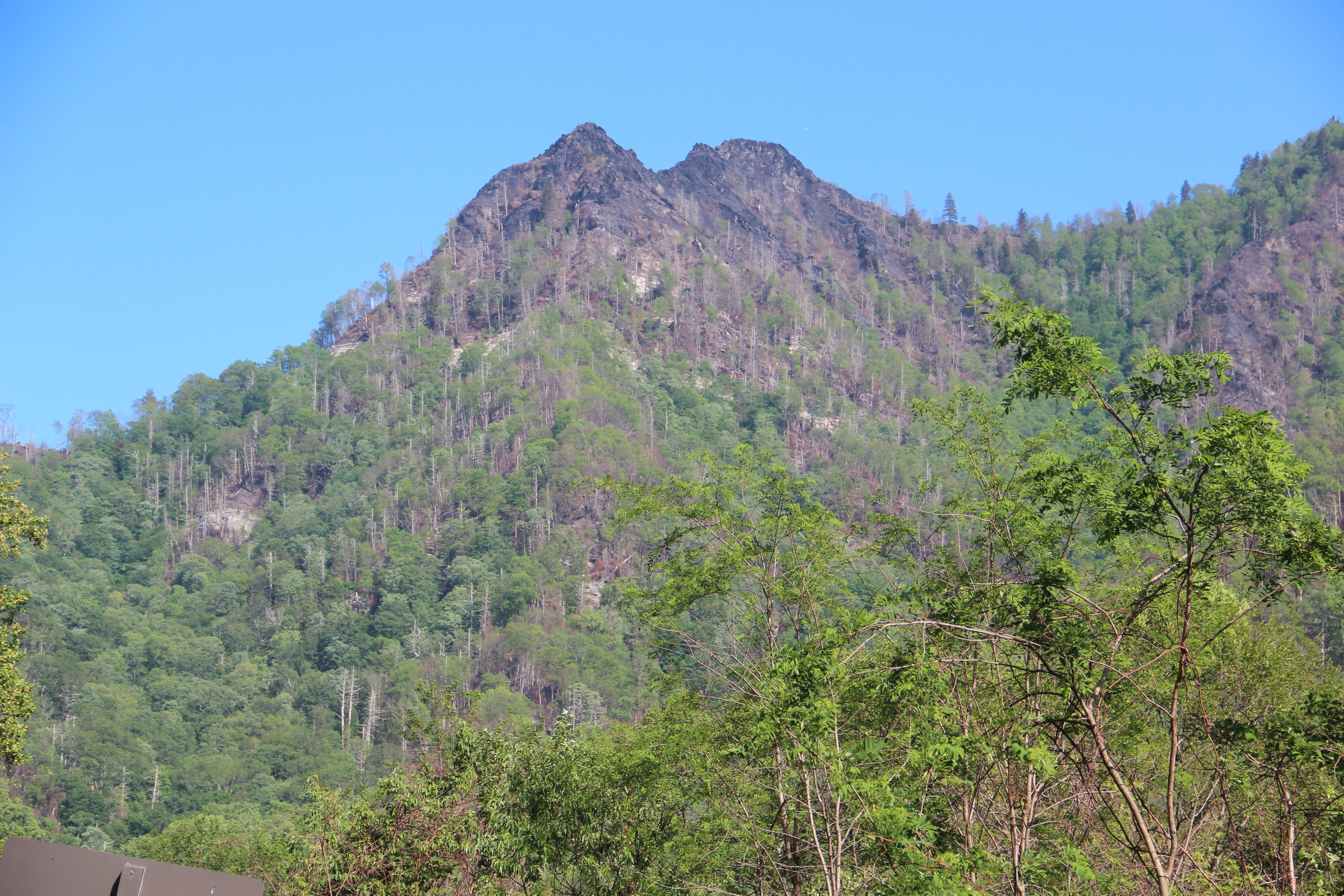
Chimney Tops, seen about 6 months after the fires with visible burn scars

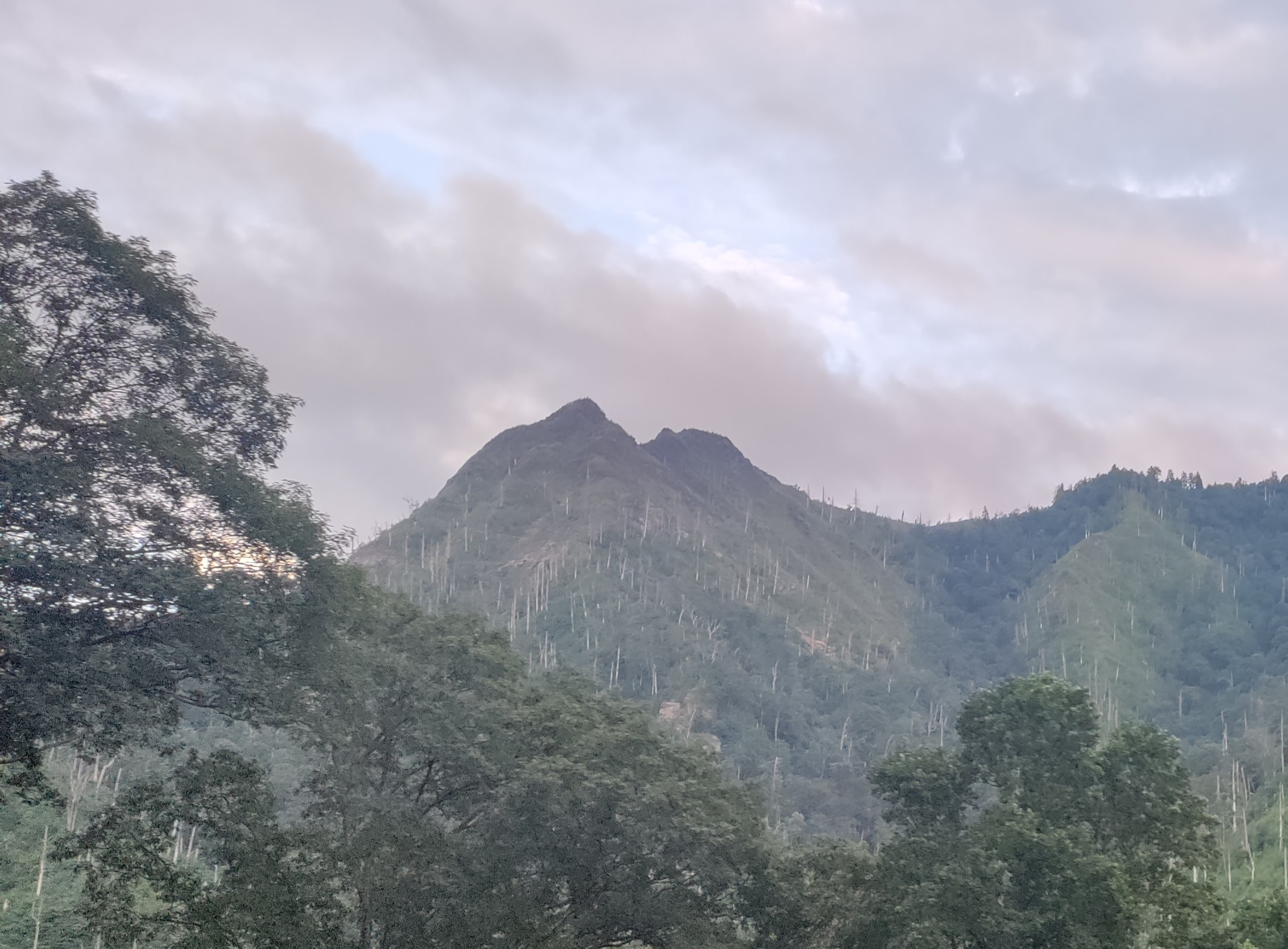
Chimney Tops seen more than 7 years after the fires; regrowth has taken place but burn scars remain visible

The Chimney Tops 2 Fire was originally reported on November 23, 2016. No suppression activities were initiated and on November 24, 2016, park fire officials delineated containment boundary made of natural features which were hoped to contain the fire. On November 27, while the fire was still inside the containment boundary, three Chinook helicopters dumped water on the fire in an effort to mitigate its spread. Humidity values for this day dropped to as low as 17 percent during a period of "Exceptional" drought. A National Weather Service report issued on Sunday predicted wind gusts up to 40 mph the following day.

On November 28, park employees observed that the fire had spread to the Chimneys Picnic Area north of and outside the containment boundary. Shortly thereafter fire was reported some distance further to the North in the park behind a residential area known as Mynatt Park. Throughout the afternoon and evening of November 28, numerous fires developed in the Gatlinburg and Pigeon Forge areas as a result of wind-driven sparks or downed power lines. Strong southerly winds (with wind gusts up to 87 mph) created by mountain waves blew sparks into the Gatlinburg and Pigeon Forge areas and knocked down trees (which in turn started fires when they hit power lines). A separate named fire destroyed much of the Cobbly Nob subdivision east of Gatlinburg.

Because of power outages to some pumping stations on November 28 and because other pumping stations burned, hydrants quickly went dry on November 28, and Gatlinburg Fire Chief Greg Miller first asked for help from all of Sevier County and later from the entire state. Damage from the fires also prevented firefighters from communicating with each other through cell phones as the radio system became overloaded. Gatlinburg's emergency operations center phone system went down when it lost power. Even the 911 system could not handle all the calls it received, and calls intended for Sevier County went to Putnam County instead.

== Investigation and arrests ==
Two unnamed juveniles were initially charged with aggravated arson in connection to the fires; these were dropped due to lack of evidence and an agreement between the State of Tennessee and the Department of the Interior which excluded state jurisdiction from prosecuting criminal activities that occur entirely within the park. Throughout the course of the investigation which revealed that many of the area fires were likely caused by embers wind-blown from the existing larger fire, local officials declined to release any information about the fires or response, citing an erroneous interpretation of a gag order.

== Reactions ==
President Barack Obama ordered federal disaster relief funds to go to the hard hit area of Sevier County in response to the vast devastation.

President-elect Donald Trump tweeted: "My thoughts and prayers are with the great people of Tennessee during these terrible wildfires. Stay safe!"

Governor Bill Haslam viewed the fires from above, and said it was "a little numbing" to see the extent of the damage. Noting that the region is a "special place" in Tennessee, he said "millions of families have come here and will continue to come here."

Commenting on the devastation, country music star Dolly Parton (originally from Sevierville) said she was "heartbroken". Her theme park, Dollywood (in Pigeon Forge), was largely spared from damage.

== Telethons ==
A telethon, benefiting fire victims, was held December 9, in Nashville. The event featured country music artists such as Kenny Chesney, Brad Paisley, John Rich, John Oates, and Kristian Bush, and Dolly Parton. $9 million were raised.

Parton hosted another telethon Tuesday, December 13, also in Nashville. All of the proceeds raised went to help those who lost their homes in the wildfires. Her fund, the "My People Fund", provided $1,000 a month for six months to over 900 families affected by the wildfires, finally culminating with $5,000 to each home in the final month due to increased fundraising, for a total of $10,000 per family.

== Aftermath ==
Soon after the fires were contained, Gatlinburg Mayor Mike Warner implored vacationers "If you really want to do something for Gatlinburg, come back and visit us."

Stefanie Benjamin, Associate Professor of Hospitality and Tourism at the University of Tennessee noted that despite negative press from the fire, the region "was able to recuperate fairly quickly."

The impact of the "My People Fund"'s financial relief, as well as the overall impacts of the disaster on residents, was studied by University of Tennessee College of Social Work professor Stacia West, who examined the impact of cash transfers in poverty alleviation. West surveyed 100 recipients of the emergency relief funds in April 2017 on topics including questions on housing, financial impact, physical and emotional health, and sources of support, with a follow-up survey conducted in December 2017. West found that the "My People Fund," in tandem with traditional disaster response, gave families the ability to make decisions that were most beneficial to them, and concluded that unconditional cash support may be more beneficial for disaster relief than conditional financial support. The report cited the impact of the monthly financial disbursements from the "My People Fund" on residents' emergency savings: "Following the monthly disbursements of unconditional cash assistance, participants were able to return to baseline financial stability reported prior to the wildfire, and improve their ability to set aside savings for hypothetical future emergencies."

On May 24, 2018, a federal lawsuit was filed against the Great Smoky Mountains National Park on behalf of victims seeking damages for the failure to stop the Chimney Tops 2 fire before it left the park. U.S. District Judge Ronnie Greer ruled September 8, 2020 that the National Park Service failed in its efforts to warn people in the area about the fires, meaning the park service can be held financially responsible and making a jury trial possible. Greer dismissed the suit in 2022 over "a paperwork error" but was overruled by an appellate panel in August 2023. The discovery process comes next and both sides have the opportunity for summary judgment.

== See also ==
- 2016 Southeastern United States wildfires
- Appalachian-Blue Ridge forests
- Burned area emergency response
- English Mountain, also in the Great Smoky Mountains and scene of significant wildfires in April 2016
- November 2016 Israel fires
- Southern Appalachian spruce-fir forest
