= Mount Le Conte (Tennessee) =

Mountain in United States of America

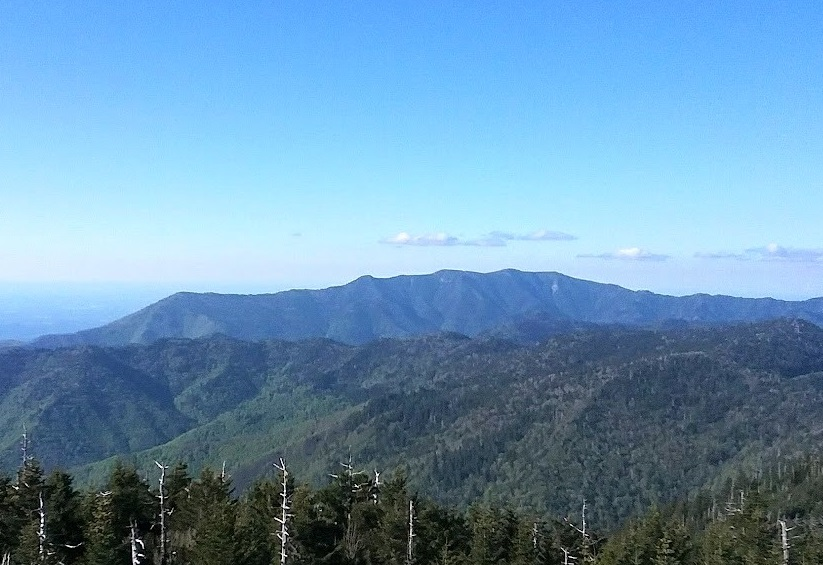
- Mount Le Conte from Kuwohi

Highest point
- Elevation: 6,593 ft (2,010 m)
- Prominence: 1,360 ft (410 m)
- Coordinates: 35°39′15″N 83°26′12″W

Geography
- Location: Sevier County, Tennessee
- Parent range: Appalachian Mountains, Blue Ridge Mountains, Great Smoky Mountains
- Topo map: USGS Mount Le Conte

Climbing
- First ascent: unknown
- Easiest route: Hike

Mount Le Conte (or LeConte) is a mountain located within the Great Smoky Mountains National Park in Sevier County, Tennessee. At 6,593 ft (2,010 m) it is the third highest peak in the national park, behind Kuwohi (formerly Clingmans Dome) (6,643 ft (2,025 m)) and Mount Guyot (6,621 ft (2,018 m)). It is also the highest peak that is completely within Tennessee. From its immediate base to its summit, Mount Le Conte is the mountain with the highest relief east of the Rocky Mountains, rising 5,301 ft (1,616 m) from its base, near Gatlinburg, Tennessee (elevation 1,292 ft (394 m)). For comparison, Pre-1980 Mount St. Helens in Washington was roughly 5,000 ft (1,524 m) above its base.

There are four subpeaks above 6,000 ft (1,829 m) on the mountain (referred to as the LeConte massif): West Point (6,344 ft (1,934 m)), High Top (6,593 ft (2,010 m)), Cliff Tops (6,555 ft (1,998 m)), and Myrtle Point (6,200 ft (1,890 m)). In addition, Balsam Point, with an elevation above 5,840 ft (1,780 m), serves as the dramatic west end of the massif.

Mount Le Conte has the highest inn that provides lodging for visitors in the Eastern United States.

== History ==
There is controversy over which member of the Le Conte family the mountain was named for. The United States Geological Survey lists geologist Joseph Le Conte as the man for whom the mountain was named, supposedly by Swiss explorer Arnold Guyot. However, in recent years this claim has been challenged by local authorities (including the authors of A Natural History of Mount Le Conte), who believe that the mountain derives its name from Joseph's older brother John Le Conte, a physicist at the University of South Carolina. Their story alleges that the mountain was named by Samuel Buckley in respect to John's help in moving his barometer to Waynesville, North Carolina, at Buckley's request.

Although the mountain was measured in the 1850s, very little activity took place on the mountain until the 1920s, when Paul Adams moved to Knoxville, Tennessee. An enthusiastic hiker and explorer, Adams spent much of his free time creating adventures in the mountains. In 1924 he joined the Great Smoky Mountain Conservation Association, a group dedicated to making the region into a national park. As part of this push, later that year he led an expedition up the mountain with dignitaries from Washington, D.C., in order to show the group what rugged beauty those mountains held. The group spent the night in a large tent, on which site LeConte Lodge was eventually built. The trip was a great success, and about a decade later Mount Le Conte and the surrounding region was protected as part of the Great Smoky Mountains National Park.

== Geography and geology ==
Mount Le Conte is part of the Great Smoky Mountains range of the Blue Ridge geologic and physiographic province of the Appalachian Mountains. It is located in the center of the Great Smoky Mountains National Park and is surrounded by several lower mountains. It is approximately 7 miles (11 km) north-northeast of Kuwohi (formerly Clingmans Dome), the highest mountain in the park and in Tennessee, and 3 miles (4.8 km) from the North Carolina state line. The mountain consists of a long massif, oriented in an east-to-west direction, which contains four major peaks. These peaks, from west to east, are known as West Point (elevation 6,344 feet (1,934 m)), Cliff Tops (6,555 feet (1,998 m), High Top (6,593 feet (2,010 m)), and Myrtle Point (6,443 feet (1,964 m)). Balsam Point, another peak, is located west of the main massif and has an elevation of 5,820 feet (1,770 m). Cliff Tops and Myrtle Point both provide nearly 360 degree views, while the other peaks are completely forested. A spring is located atop the mountain, which is the main water source for LeConte Lodge.

The massif is made up of Late Proterozoic rocks, mostly metamorphosed sandstone, siltstone, shale, and conglomerate formed over 800–450 million years ago. Millions of years of weathering have caused significant erosion, giving the mountains in the region, including Le Conte, a distinctive, gentle sloping profile. A dense stand of Southern Appalachian spruce-fir forest, a remnant from the Last Glacial Period, covers the mountain's peaks and upper slopes.

== Climate ==
Mount Le Conte has a humid continental climate (Dfb) bordering on a subalpine climate (Dfc) at higher elevation, giving it cool summers and cold winters. Annual snowfall averages 40 inches (1,000 mm) near the base to 80 inches (2,000 mm) on the peaks. The climate is much cooler and somewhat wetter than the lower elevations. The lowest temperature ever recorded was −23 °F (−31 °C), on February 19, 2015. The highest temperature ever recorded was 82 °F (28 °C) on July 1, 2012, and August 7, 2023.

Climate data for Mount LeConte (1991–2020 normals, extremes 1988–present)
Month	Jan	Feb	Mar	Apr	May	Jun	Jul	Aug	Sep	Oct	Nov	Dec	Year
Record high °F (°C)	60 (16)	60 (16)	69 (21)	71 (22)	79 (26)	81 (27)	82 (28)	82 (28)	77 (25)	74 (23)	68 (20)	61 (16)	82 (28)
Mean maximum °F (°C)	49.9 (9.9)	50.2 (10.1)	57.8 (14.3)	66.1 (18.9)	69.1 (20.6)	72.2 (22.3)	74.1 (23.4)	73.8 (23.2)	71.2 (21.8)	67.4 (19.7)	57.4 (14.1)	51.7 (10.9)	76.0 (24.4)
Mean daily maximum °F (°C)	33.5 (0.8)	35.2 (1.8)	41.0 (5.0)	50.2 (10.1)	56.5 (13.6)	62.5 (16.9)	65.6 (18.7)	65.0 (18.3)	60.8 (16.0)	53.5 (11.9)	43.6 (6.4)	37.0 (2.8)	50.4 (10.2)
Daily mean °F (°C)	25.5 (−3.6)	27.4 (−2.6)	32.5 (0.3)	41.0 (5.0)	48.3 (9.1)	54.8 (12.7)	58.0 (14.4)	57.1 (13.9)	52.6 (11.4)	44.6 (7.0)	35.2 (1.8)	29.2 (−1.6)	42.2 (5.7)
Mean daily minimum °F (°C)	17.5 (−8.1)	19.5 (−6.9)	24.1 (−4.4)	31.7 (−0.2)	40.1 (4.5)	47.1 (8.4)	50.3 (10.2)	49.3 (9.6)	44.3 (6.8)	35.8 (2.1)	26.8 (−2.9)	21.4 (−5.9)	34.0 (1.1)
Mean minimum °F (°C)	−7.6 (−22.0)	−1.7 (−18.7)	2.3 (−16.5)	12.8 (−10.7)	24.0 (−4.4)	35.5 (1.9)	41.2 (5.1)	40.4 (4.7)	31.9 (−0.1)	17.5 (−8.1)	7.0 (−13.9)	0.3 (−17.6)	−10.9 (−23.8)
Record low °F (°C)	−18 (−28)	−23 (−31)	−11 (−24)	1 (−17)	12 (−11)	28 (−2)	30 (−1)	30 (−1)	19 (−7)	10 (−12)	−2 (−19)	−22 (−30)	−23 (−31)
Average precipitation inches (mm)	7.17 (182)	5.80 (147)	6.69 (170)	7.53 (191)	7.30 (185)	8.71 (221)	8.71 (221)	7.53 (191)	6.68 (170)	5.15 (131)	6.40 (163)	6.82 (173)	84.49 (2,146)
Average snowfall inches (cm)	16.1 (41)	13.8 (35)	16.9 (43)	6.4 (16)	1.3 (3.3)	0.0 (0.0)	0.0 (0.0)	0.0 (0.0)	0.0 (0.0)	2.5 (6.4)	5.4 (14)	14.4 (37)	76.8 (195)
Average precipitation days (≥ 0.01 in)	13.6	12.2	13.2	13.5	16.0	16.9	17.6	15.5	12.1	10.8	10.4	12.7	164.5
Average snowy days (≥ 0.1 in)	7.1	6.7	5.4	2.5	0.5	0.0	0.0	0.0	0.0	0.6	2.4	5.5	30.7
Source: NOAA

== LeConte Lodge ==
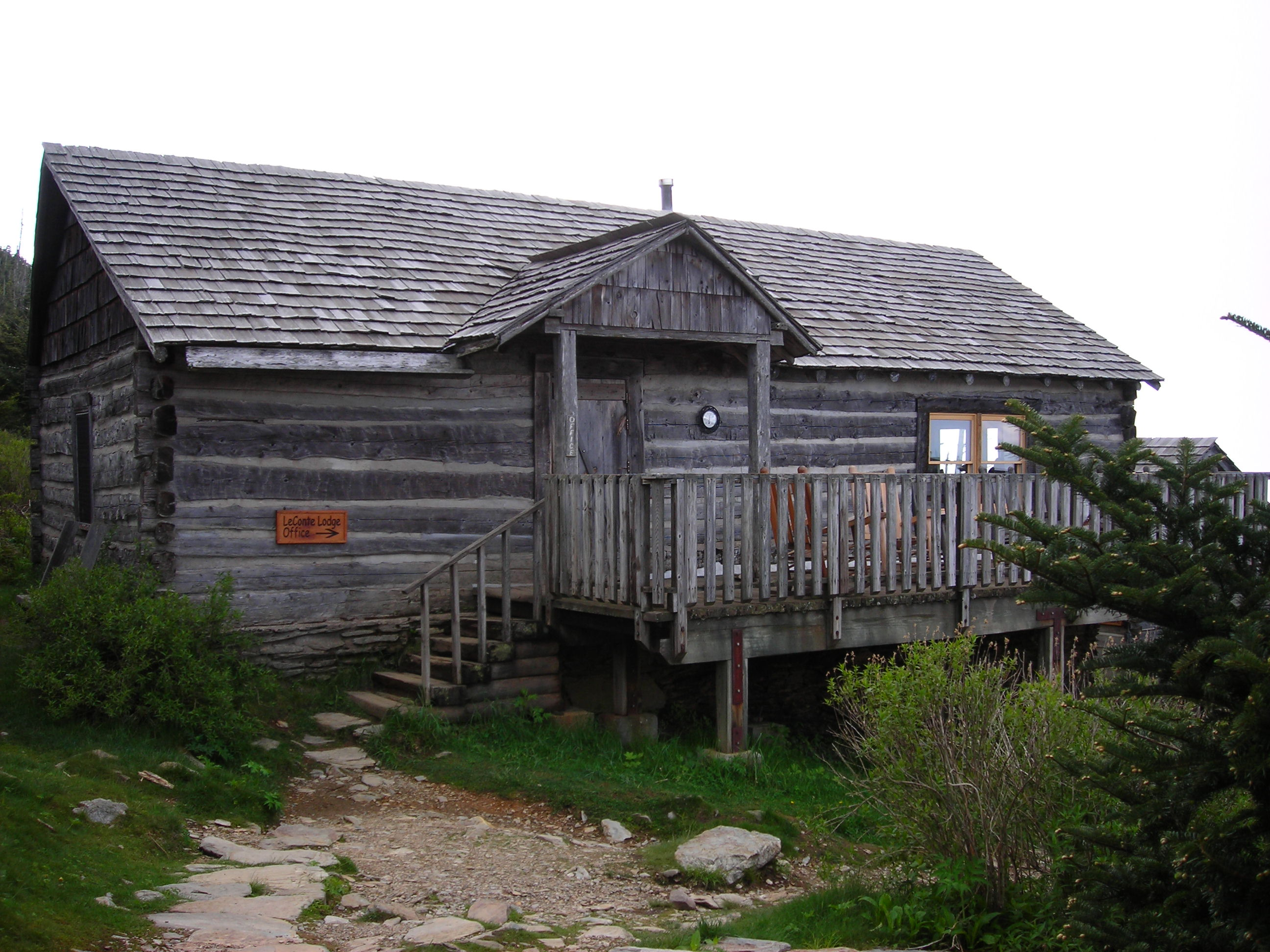
The office of the LeConte Lodge

Mount Le Conte is notable for having the highest inn providing lodging for visitors in the Eastern United States. The LeConte Lodge is a small resort, established in 1925, located on the top of the mountain. First it was a tent, then a single cabin, and now it is a series of small personal log cabins and a central lodge and dining hall near the top of a mountain. It can accommodate about 50 guests and is generally open from March to November. There is no transportation to the lodge, and all guests must hike in on one of the five trails that access the mountain. Because of this lack of access, supplies must be brought in via helicopter and llama pack trains. The climate at the lodge is similar to that found in southern Canada, with cool summers and cold, snowy winters. Currently, the lodge is maintained under a lease with the National Park Service.

== Access ==
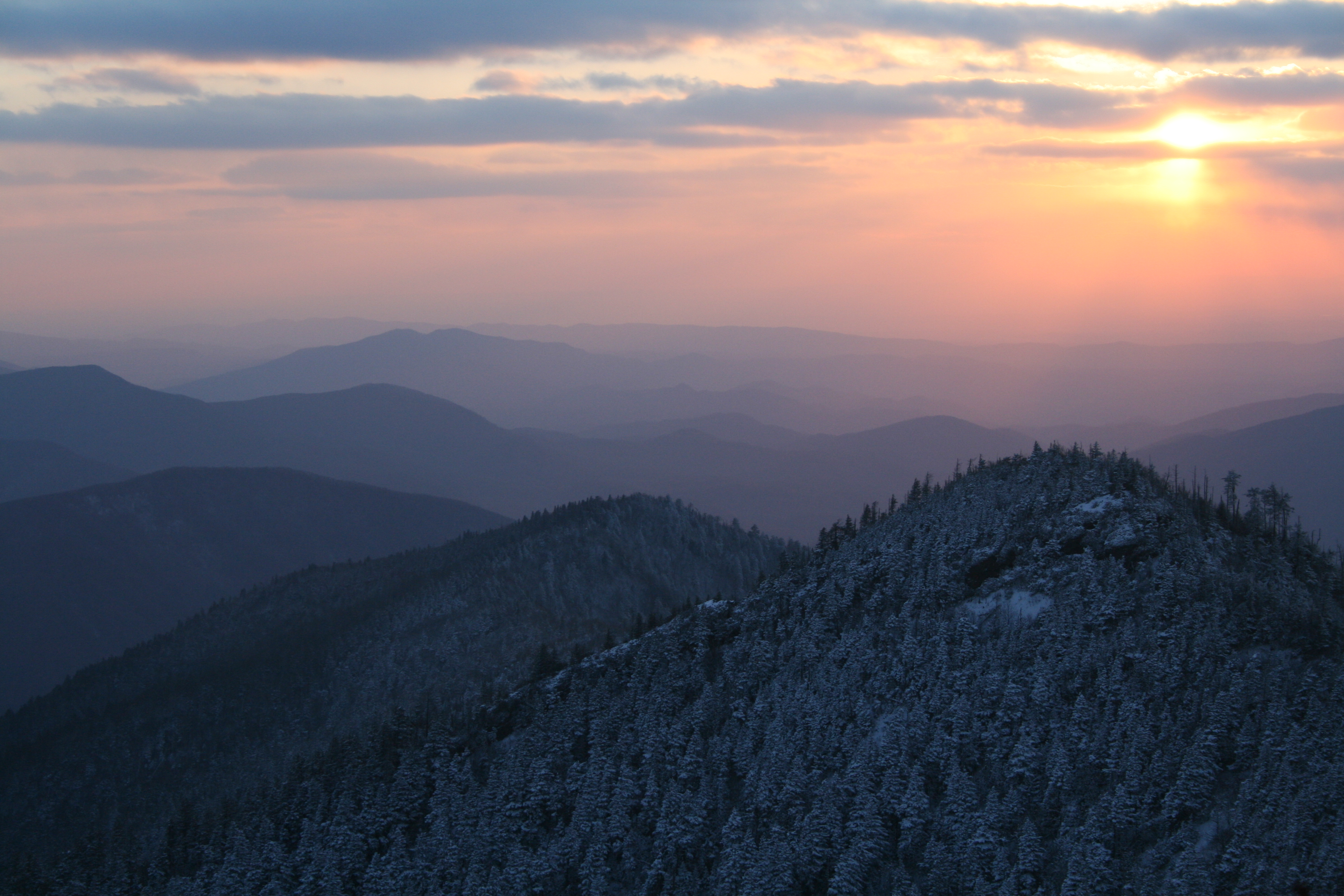
View from Cliff Tops atop Mount LeConte

Le Conte's location in the Great Smoky Mountains National Park has spurred the creation of five trails that lead to the LeConte Lodge, with spur trails to each of the individual peaks. In addition to the scenic overlooks and peaceful woodlands endemic to each path, every trail offers attractions along the way to the summit. They are listed with their distances one-way as follows:

- Alum Cave Trail — 4.9 mi (7.9 km). Alum Cave Creek, Arch Rock, Alum Cave Bluff and views into Huggins Hell adorn the trail. It is the most scenic and most often used trail to the summit.
- The Boulevard Trail — 5.4 mi (8.7 km) from the Appalachian Trail (8.0 mi or 12.9 km from Newfound Gap). The Boulevard begins on the crest of the Great Smoky Mountains on the Appalachian Trail, 2.7 mi (4.3 km) east of Newfound Gap. It never dips below 5,500 ft (1,676 m).
- Bullhead Trail — 6.9 mi (11.1 km). The least traveled path, it offers the most solitude.
- Rainbow Falls Trail — 6.6 mi (10.6 km). LeConte Creek runs alongside the trail until Rainbow Falls, the single highest drop of water in the national park.
- Trillium Gap Trail — 8.9 mi (14.3 km). The trail passes behind Grotto Falls, the only opportunity to walk behind a waterfall in the park. Trillium Gap offers spring wildflowers and a short spur hike to Brushy Mountain, the only horse trail on the mountain. The llama trains that supply the lodge use this trail. Starting the Trillium Gap Trail at the Trillium Gap parking lot shortens the climb by 2.4 mi (3.9 km), making this a 6.5 mi (10.5 km) trail.

The combined traffic of these five trails makes Mount Le Conte one of the most heavily traversed mountains in the park. The Alum Cave and Rainbow Falls trails in particular tend to become overcrowded with visitors seeking rewarding payoffs just a few miles into the trails. Hikers can stay in an Appalachian Trail style shelter overnight for $8, limited to 12 spots, with a backcountry permit and reservations from the National Park Service. The area was affected by the 2016 Great Smoky Mountains wildfires. The park, including the area around Mt. Le Conte, was evacuated during the disaster.
