= Hiking in the Great Smoky Mountains National Park =

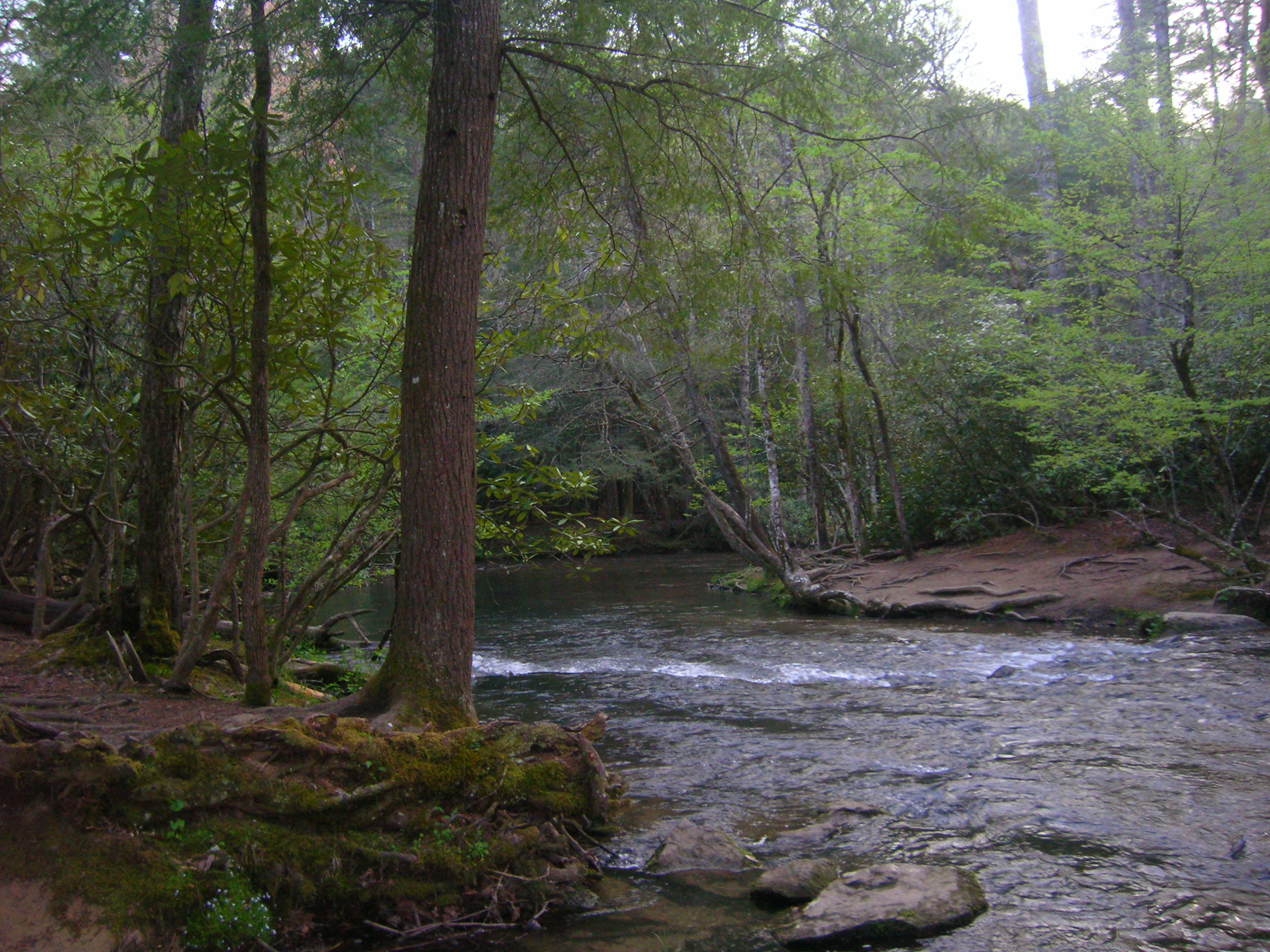
Abrams Creek is the largest creek wholly within the national park

The Great Smoky Mountains National Park is a United States National Park located in a region of the Appalachian Mountains referred to as the Great Smoky Mountains, in a portion of east-central Tennessee and southwest North Carolina. With over 150 hiking trails extending for more than 850 miles (1,370 km), within its boundaries, including a seventy-mile segment of the Appalachian Trail, hiking is the most popular activity in the national park.

== Development of hiking trails in the national park ==
As plans to create a national park in the eastern United States began to unfold in the 1920s, specifically in the area of eastern Tennessee and western North Carolina, various organizations began the process of procuring lands and constructing for the eventual national park. At the same time, the Great Depression had wrought havoc among the nation's people, leaving many homeless and unemployed. One of the organizations then-president Franklin Delano Roosevelt created to get Americans working again, the Civilian Conservation Corps (CCC) was instrumental in the development of the hiking trails and campsites in the national park. Many of the hundreds of miles of trails in the park were dug by the CCC in its formative years—even those still in place today.

The logging era also played a major role in the development of hiking trails in the Smokies. During the early 1900s, lumber companies began using trains to haul timber out of the mountains, which allowed them to penetrate further up the valleys of the major watersheds. At the height of the logging boom, more than 200 miles of rail lines traced through the mountains. After the lumber companies rolled up their tracks, the CCC began converting the old railroad beds into roads and hiking trails. The Little River, Jakes Creek, Goshen Prong, Middle Prong, Lumber Ridge, West Prong, Big Creek, Baxter Creek, Eagle Creek, Hazel Creek, Forney Creek, Hemphill Bald and Balsam Mountain trails are all examples of former railroad beds being transformed into recreational trails.

Other hiking trails were, in another incarnation, in use hundreds of years in the past. Before the settlement of Anglo-Americans, largely from Scotland and Ireland, in the area of today's Great Smoky Mountain National Park, the region was a small portion of the expansive Cherokee territory. The Cherokee often traveled over the mountains via established routes for trading and reaching hunting grounds away from their homes. Over the years with the steadying encroachment of white settlers, many of the old Cherokee mountain roads were adapted to the uses of the new settlers and, eventually, a few of these were converted over to some of the hiking trails in the national park.

Prior to its establishment as a national park, the coves and valleys surrounding the park were dotted with small farms and settlements. In order to communicate and conduct trade between settlements and outside towns, the pioneers established an extensive network of trails and wagon roads. Several of those routes now exist as park trails. The Schoolhouse Gap and the Cooper Road trails in the Cades Cove area, as well as the Little Brier Gap Trail in Little Greenbrier are prime examples of old wagon roads being converted into footpaths. Originally constructed by the residents of Sugarlands and Gatlinburg, the Huskey Gap Trail was first used by employees of the Little River Lumber Company to travel to and from their jobs in Elkmont. The trail was later used by children from these same communities to attend a log schoolhouse at Huskey Gap, located near the present-day intersection with the Sugarland Mountain Trail.

Local settlers also blazed trails that allowed them to graze livestock along the grassy balds that once prevailed atop the crest of the Smokies. As populations grew around the base of the mountains, homesteaders resorted to driving cattle, sheep and goats into the mountains to feed on the rich grasses that thrived atop the balds during the summer months. This in-turn allowed them to use the increasingly limited land space in the valleys for growing crops. Roughly midway through the nineteenth century, Cades Cove residents began driving stock into the mountains using routes that are still used today, such as the Gregory Ridge Trail to Gregory Bald, the Anthony Creek Trail to Russell Field, or the Bote Mountain Trail to Spence Field. The Sweat Heifer Creek Trail was also used to herd cattle up to Sweat Heifer Ridge near Newfound Gap.

In addition to the work of the Civilian Conservation Corps, as well as the mountain routes of the Cherokee Indians and homesteaders, various hiking clubs have also worked to improve upon currently established trails and to construct entirely new trails in their own right. Perhaps the most popular of these, the Appalachian Trail Conservancy, which promotes the conservation of the Appalachian Trail, works through an affiliated club to maintain the trail within the national park. Other similar groups perform similar functions on trails throughout the park.

== Hiking trails of the national park ==
Of the more than 150 hiking trails in the Great Smoky Mountains National Park, the majority of traffic centers on a few of the shorter trails located just off the main highway, U.S. Highway 441 (Newfound Gap Road). The lengthier, more isolated trails are much less frequented, though, at any one time, very few hikers are completely alone in the park.

Trails in the park cover all types; Short, self-guided nature trails are found off the highways in purposely diverse areas of the park, while longer, strenuous backpacking hikes are available along the Appalachian and various other primarily highland trails. Some trails are paved, some lead to waterfalls, others to overlooks, and still others lead to more trails.

=== The 900 Miler Club ===
Hikers who complete all 150 trails within the Great Smoky Mountains National Park and apply for membership are called "900 Milers" and are entered into the list of The 900 Miler Club. They've recorded and completed each trail within the Smokies and turned in their application to the group. For a small fee they can purchase a badge, magnet or sticker showing their accomplishment as well. The current unofficial total of the club members is 705 as of 9/9/2021. The fastest known time (FKT) for completion of the 900 Miler Club is by Jeff Woody with a time of "33d 8h 51m 0s" completed on 8/25/2020.

=== Cross-country trails ===
Perhaps the most famous trail in the world (certainly in the United States), the Appalachian Trail bisects the national park, for most of its 70-mile (110 km) length within the park running on the border of Tennessee and North Carolina. Another lesser known, more recently constructed footpath, the Mountains-to-Sea Trail, begins (or ends) at the Kuwohi Observation Tower, and runs, as the name suggests, from North Carolina's mountainous border with Tennessee, to the Atlantic Ocean at Cape Hatteras, North Carolina.

- Appalachian Trail: Seventy miles of the 2,158-mile (3,473 km) Appalachian Trail cut through the Great Smoky Mountains National Park, entering northward at Davenport Gap and exiting southward near Fontana Dam. The trail remains among the crestline of the Great Smoky Mountains throughout this portion of its length, passing just behind the observation tower at Kuwohi, the highest point anywhere along the trail (at 6,625 ft or 2,019 m). Shelters are placed approximately equidistant of one another, at locations roughly equivalent to one day of backpacking from one shelter to the next. While spending the night there is free, unless determined to be thru-hiking (which the national park determines as anyone starting a minimum of fifty miles [eighty kilometers] and ending at least as far outside of the park) it requires a permit obtainable through the park service to stay in the shelters.
- Mountains-to-Sea Trail: Though only 365.4 miles (588 km) of the planned 700-to-800-mile (1,100 to 1,300 km) trail is completed, North Carolina's statewide trail is intended to stretch from the mountains of the Great Smoky Mountains National Park to the state's Outer Banks on the Atlantic Ocean. The segment of the trail within the national park extends for twenty-five miles (forty kilometers) and is three-fourths completed, starting near the summit of Kuwohi. Since this part (and many other portions) of the trail is composed largely of other pre-existing trails, it is navigable for much of its existing length.

=== Trails: Cades Cove ===
Cades Cove is the most visited area of the most visited national park in the United States. Though most of these two million visitors each year don't veer very far away from the one-way loop road that traverses the valley, hiking trails accessible from the road are nonetheless still often busier than most.

- Abrams Falls Trail: The Abrams Falls Trail, often clogged with visitors to Cades Cove, is the most popular trail in the area. It leads 2.5 miles (4.0 km) to the most voluminous waterfall in the national park, under which many summer patrons enjoy swimming in its large natural pool. The trail continues beyond the waterfall for 1.7 miles (2.7 km) to connect with Little Bottoms Trail and backcountry campsite 17. A total hike of 4.9 miles (7.9 km) will lead to the trail head at Abrams Creek campground. This is a much more difficult trail than the section from Cades Cove. Campsite 17 is fairly popular and much of the trail provides good access for fishing.
- Gregory Bald Trail and Gregory Ridge Trail: The national park service only maintains two balds in the park: Andrews Bald and Gregory Bald. Two trails provide access to the grass bald, one of the largest in the national park. The 9-mile (14 km) [round trip] Gregory Bald Trail isn't in Cades Cove itself, but Parsons Branch Road, which provides dayhikers access to the trailhead, leads one way out of the cove, while the 11.4-mile (18.3 km) Gregory Ridge Trail [round trip] is just out of Cades Cove, on Forge Creek Road. Though the views that it offers are available year-round, Gregory Bald is most noted for the flame azaleas that bloom wildly in late June.
- Rich Mountain Loop Trail: Rich Mountain dominates the Cades Cove valley. A one-way gravel road leads out of the national park over Rich Mountain, though this road is surprisingly lonely. The loop trail, though, gets a bit more traffic. Extending 8.5 miles (13.7 km) from its lone terminus at the foot of the Cades Cove Loop Road, the trail skirts just behind the popular John Oliver Cabin before ascending Rich Mountain, offering a few views down into the Cades Cove below, via a three trail path.

==== Other trails in the area ====
- Crooked Arm Ridge Trail
- Grave Gap Trail
- Rich Mountain Trail
- Scott Mountain Trail

=== Trails: Cherokee Orchard/Roaring Fork ===
The Roaring Fork Motor Nature Trail is a one way paved roadway accessible only via Cherokee Orchard Road just out of the small resort city of Gatlinburg. The area's proximity to Gatlinburg lends it to a relatively high number of visitors during mid-day in the peak tourist seasons and on weekends, though dayhikers usually concentrate at Grotto and Rainbow Falls.

Three of the trails in this region lead to the summit of Mount Le Conte, one of the most popular destinations for hikers in the Great Smoky Mountains National Park. Here, the LeConte Lodge provides the only commercial lodging within the national park and annually sells out all of its rooms, which contain no electricity or running water, months in advance. The mountain is also popular for its vistas at Myrtle Point and the Cliff Tops.

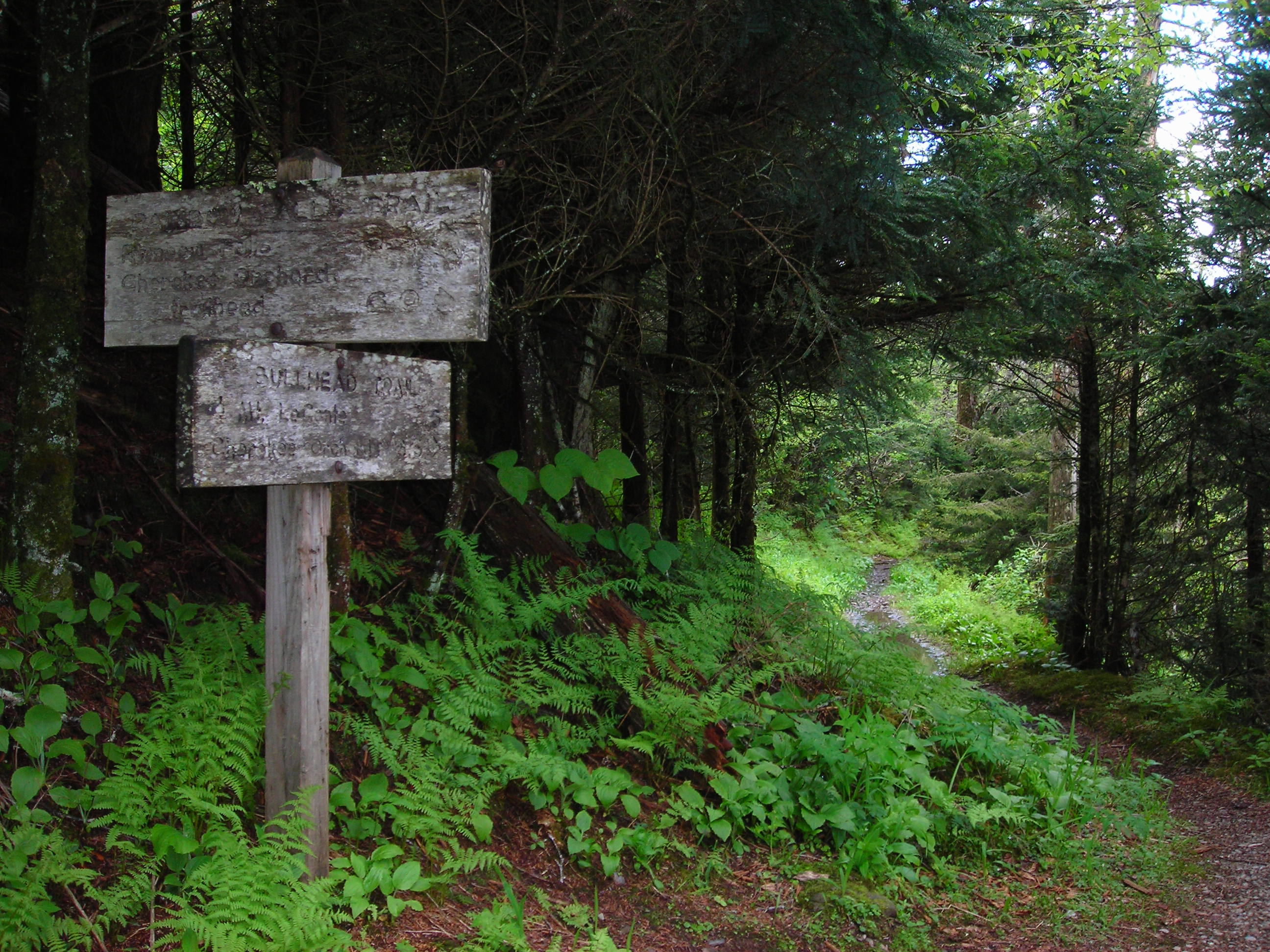
Bullhead Trail

- Bullhead Trail: Of the five trails that lead to the summit of Mount Le Conte, the 6.9-mile (11.1 km) Bullhead Trail is the least popular. There are two reasons for this designation: its isolation and its lack of side attractions. Besides that accessing the trail requires at least a 0.4-mile (640 m) walk to the trailhead along the Old Sugarlands Trail, all of the other trails en route to the LeConte Lodge at Mount Le Conte pass by other significant landmarks, such as waterfalls or unique rock formations, but the Bullhead Trail simply ascends Le Conte. Of course, though, for some hikers, this loneliness is a good thing.
- Baskins Creek Trail: Baskins Creek Falls is by far the least known waterfall in this area. The others, Rainbow and Grotto Falls, both get so many sightseers that their auxiliary parking lots are routinely overflown with vehicles. The 3.3-mile (5.3 km) round trip Baskins Creek Trail passes by an old cemetery just a few yards into its length where many residents of the area were buried before it became a national park.
- Rainbow Falls Trail: One of the five trails that leads up Mount Le Conte, the Rainbow Falls Trail follows a route similar to that taken by a group of politicians before the creation of the national park to see just what the area had to offer. The trail's namesake, Rainbow Falls, which at eighty feet contains the highest single-drop of water in the national park, is located miles into the 6.6-mile (10.6 km) footpath to the summit of Mount Le Conte. While the trek to the waterfall will be bustling with hikers, once beyond Rainbow Falls the trail thins out considerably.
- Trillium Gap Trail: Another of the five trails that ascends Mount Le Conte, the Trillium Gap Trail first passes behind Grotto Falls at 1.3 miles (2.1 km), the only waterfall in the park where this is possible. Just like at the Rainbow Falls Trail, the hike to the waterfall will be quite busy under normal circumstances, but, from points onward of the falls, will be much less populated. Trillium Gap lies 2.9 miles (4.7 km) along the trail at a junction with the Brushy Mountain Trail, where hikers can choose to pay a visit to Brushy Mountain or continue on 3.6 miles (5.8 km) to the summit of Mount Le Conte.

==== Other trails in the area ====
- Grapeyard Ridge Trail
- Old Sugarlands Trail

=== Trails: Cosby/Greenbrier ===
Cosby and Greenbrier campgrounds are located about fifteen miles (24 km) apart on the Tennessee side of the Great Smoky Mountains National Park. The campgrounds share many similarities and even a few connecting hiking trails. Each are found east of the city of Gatlinburg and, while there still exists a town of Cosby, the old Greenbrier community largely came to an end with the establishment of the national park in the 1930s.

- Lower Mount Cammerer Trail: The Lower Mount Cammerer Trail is just one of a few trails that can be taken to reach the landmark Mount Cammerer lookout tower. This, along with the Appalachian and Low Gap trails are often taken as a loop trail back down to the Cosby Campground. The trail itself is 7.4 miles (11.9 km), but the firetower from which panoramic views of the area are available is reached by a spur trail 10.3 miles (16.6 km) down the Appalachian Trail from the end of the Lower Mount Cammerer Trail.
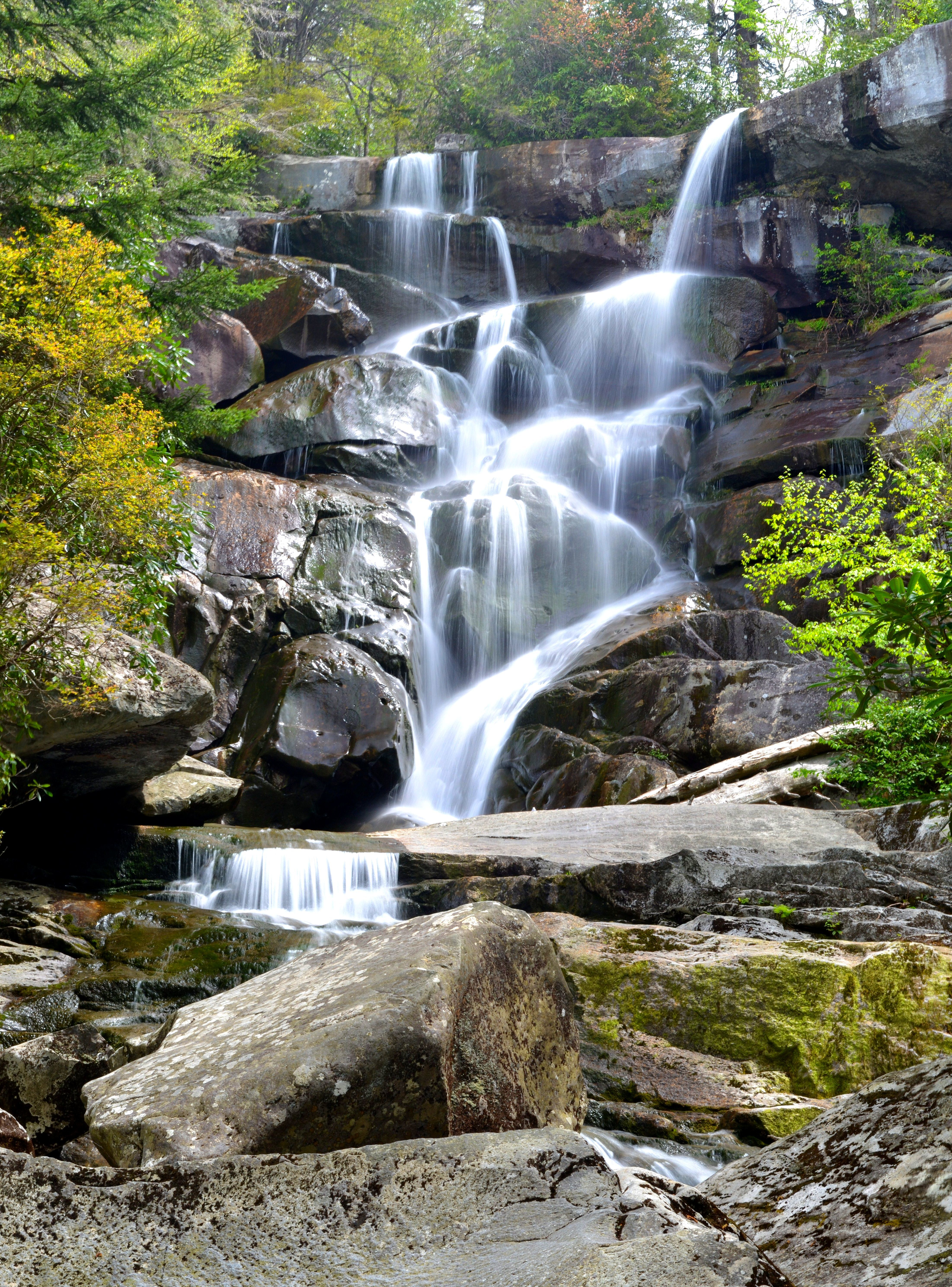
- Ramsey Cascades
  Ramsey Cascades Trail: Located as deep as is accessible by motor vehicle in the Greenbrier Cove area, the beginning of the Ramsey Cascades Trail follows an old jeep road for about the first 1.5 miles (2.4 km). Not far past here the trail enters the largest old-growth forest remaining in the national park. One of the primary reasons that the park was created was in response to the damage that the logging industry had done to the ancient forest in the region. This forest was one of the few to remain mostly unscathed. Some of the trees along the trail are among the largest known remaining in the park. The waterfall itself is about ninety feet high and is four miles (6.4 km) from the trailhead. Four people have died in recent years attempting to climb the waterfall; in response to this, the national park service advises spectators to refrain from climbing the rocks at the falls. One of these fatalities was Louise Barber, who at age 14 (circa 1963) decided to look over the falls from above and fell to her death. She was the daughter of Mr. and Mrs. David West Barber Jr. and granddaughter of David W. Barber Sr., one of the original members of the Great Smoky Mountains Hikers Club.
- Old Settlers Trail: The Old Settlers Trail is a very long footpath that links Greenbrier Cove to Cosby, passing 17 miles (27 km) of old homesteads from the days before the national park was created, moving out families that for generations lived and farmed the area. Most hikers arrange for this as a shuttle hike, whereby a friend or relative, or commercial service, is notified of about when the hiker is due to arrive at the trail's end and is driven out, rather than walking back to the beginning of the trail.
- Gabes Mountain Trail: This trail, 6.5 miles (10.5 km) in length, is known more for its access to 45-foot (14 m) Henwallow Falls than anything else, though it does extend over four miles (6.4 km) further, past the Sugar Cove campsite at around 4.5 miles (7.2 km) before running out at a junction with the Maddron Bald Trail. The trail begins just before the parking lot at the Cosby Campground.

==== Other trails in the area ====
- Brushy Mountain Trail
- Maddron Bald Trail
- Low Gap Trail
- Snake Den Ridge Trail
- Porters Creek Trail

=== Trails: Kuwohi ===
The highest point both in the State of Tennessee and along the Appalachian Trail, Kuwohi is also the hub of numerous dayhikes and longer backpacking trips. The mountain itself is one of the most popular destinations in the national park, as a seven-mile (11 km) paved road allows visitors to park only a half mile from the concrete observation tower erected in 1963, from which views into several states (on clear days) are available.

- Kuwohi/Kuwohi Bypass Trails: The only trail that possibly gets more traffic than the 0.5-mile (800 m) Kuwohi Trail is the Laurel Falls Trail near the park headquarters. Because of such heavy visitation, the park service has paved each trail, both for better accessibility and to stem erosion. Many visitors to the mountain, however, are unaware of the Kuwohi Bypass Trail, which is reached by walking a tenth of a mile off the main trail, and then rises steeply 0.6 miles (1 km) to the Appalachian Trail. Some hikers use this as a means to avoid the clogged paved trail and continue on their way to points beyond the tower, while others see it as a more traditional route to the observation tower, which is a third of a mile (half of a kilometer) to the right of the junction with the Appalachian Trail.
- Forney Ridge Trail: Reached by veering left at the base of the Kuwohi Trail, the 5.6-mile (9.0 km) Forney Ridge Trail immediately descends via a carefully implemented level of stairs built into the ground for a tenth of a mile to a junction with the Kuwohi Bypass Trail. From here the rocky trail continues to the left 1.7 miles (2.7 km) through highland Appalachian terrain to Andrews Bald, one of only two balds maintained by the National Park Service. The hike to the bald is fairly popular, though not nearly to the extent of its neighboring trail to Kuwohi, but very few hikers venture beyond Andrews Bald, as the trail descends down Forney Ridge to Board Camp Gap and a junction with the Springhouse Branch Trail.
- Road Prong Trail: Named for the stream the trail accompanies for its entire length, the 2.2-mile (3.5 km) Road Prong Trail follows an old Indian trail that was used for an unknown length of time before the settlement of whites in the region, who eventually widened the trail into a toll road, which was used from 1839 for nearly a century until the discovery of Newfound Gap and the subsequent construction of Newfound Gap Road, which effectively put Indian Gap Road (as the road had become known) out of commission. The "road" is today little more than a trail that links Kuwohi Road, at Indian Gap, to Newfound Gap Road (as the Road Prong Trail runs into the Chimney Tops Trail at its lower terminus) one mile (1.6 km) from the junction.

==== Other trails in the area ====
- Appalachian Trail
- Mountains-to-Sea Trail
- Forney Creek Trail
- Noland Divide Trail
- Spruce Fir Nature Trail

=== Trails: Little River Road/Elkmont/Tremont ===
Beginning at a fork with Newfound Gap Road and the national park headquarters at Sugarlands Visitor Center, Little River Road links the main park thoroughfare with Cades Cove, the most popular destination in the national park. The road also provides access to the Elkmont Campground (and the historic community that once thrived there), Metcalf Bottoms Picnic Area, and the Great Smoky Mountains Institute at Tremont.

- Laurel Falls Trail: Probably the most popular trail in the entire national park, the wildly popular 1.3-mile (2.1 km) walk to Laurel Falls has been paved by the park service, as the heavy traffic was causing major erosion to the former traditional footpath. The trail does go on for a total length of 4 miles (6.4 km) to the lookout tower at Cove Mountain, but this portion is mostly neglected by hikers, most of whom stop at the waterfall, one of the largest in the national park.
- Gatlinburg Trail: Only two trails in the national park allow pets (on leashes) and bicycles, and this is one of them. Most hikers pick up the 2-mile (3.2 km) Gatlinburg Trail from behind the Sugarlands Visitor Center and walk along the West Prong of the Little Pigeon River right into the city of Gatlinburg. In fact, since the trail ends at the foot of the city of Gatlinburg, a visitor staying in the resort community can walk out of his or her hotel room, onto the sidewalk, and into the national park and the Gatlinburg Trail without taking one-hundred steps.
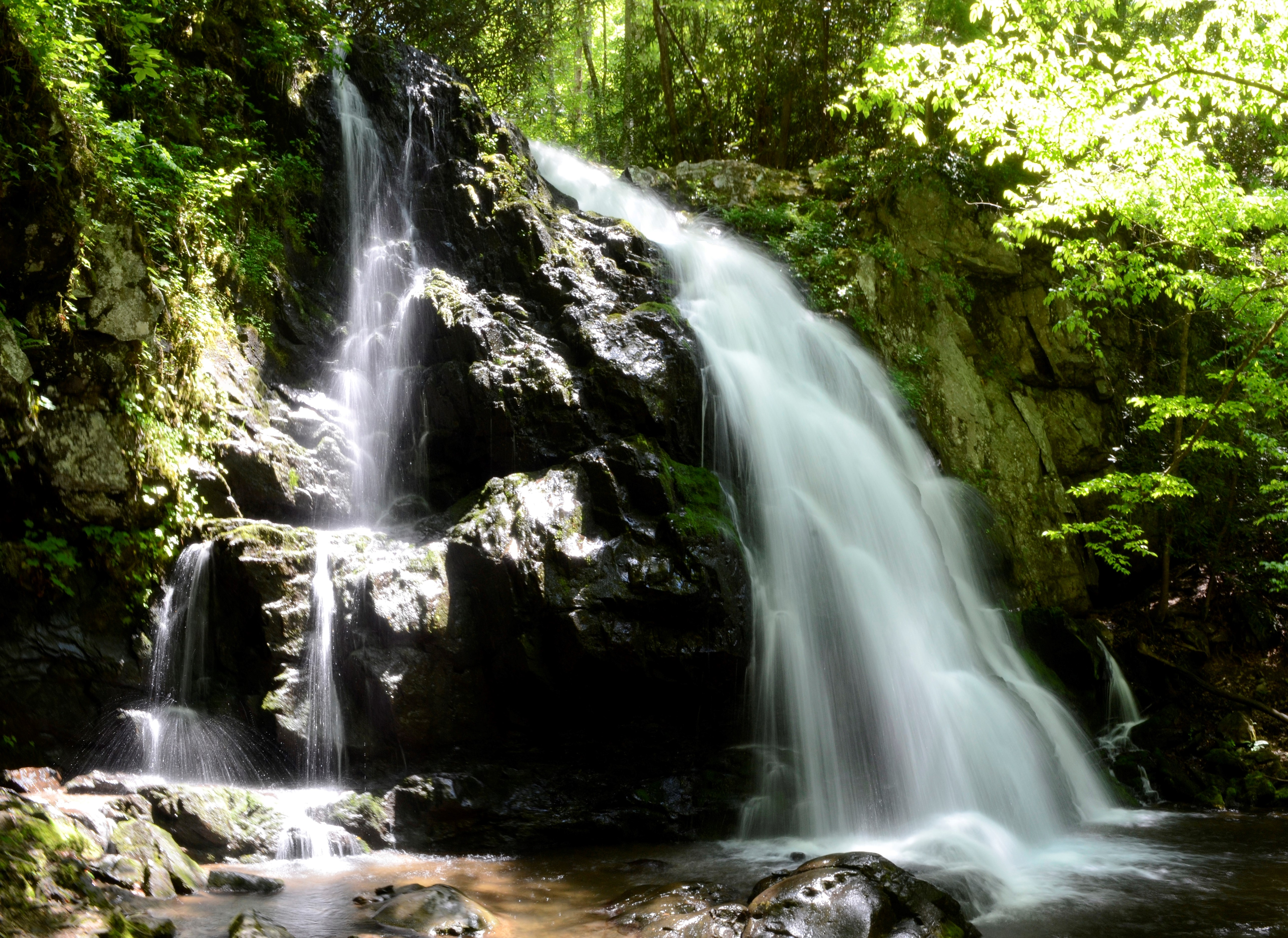
- Spruce Flats Falls
  Spruce Flats Falls Trail: This trail really has no name, is not marked, and, without knowing in advance where s/he is going, a hiker would not have any knowledge of the waterfall at the end of this trail. Because of its anonymity, Spruce Flats Falls is the most likely least visited waterfall of its size in the national park. The trail itself is only slightly longer than a mile in length and offers some views of nearby mountains before descending to the waterfall. Stop in the first building on your left after crossing the bridge at Great Smoky Mountains Institute at Tremont to get a map and details about this trail.

==== Other trails in the area ====
- Sugarland Mountain Trail
- Meigs Mountain Trail
- Roundtop Trail
- Cove Mountain Trail
- Old Sugarlands Trail
- Jakes Creek Trail

=== Trails: Newfound Gap Road ===
As the primary roadway through the Great Smoky Mountains National Park, Newfound Gap Road (U.S. Highway 441), is the hub of activity in the national park. Both of the largest visitors centers are on either end of the highway, near Gatlinburg (Sugarlands) and just out of Cherokee, North Carolina (Oconaluftee), as are most of the most popular hiking trails in the park. Newfound Gap, about midway into the park, is home to the Rockefeller Memorial, from which Franklin Roosevelt dedicated the national park in 1940. The gap is also crossed by the Appalachian Trail, which crosses alongside the memorial and over the highway towards Kuwohi.

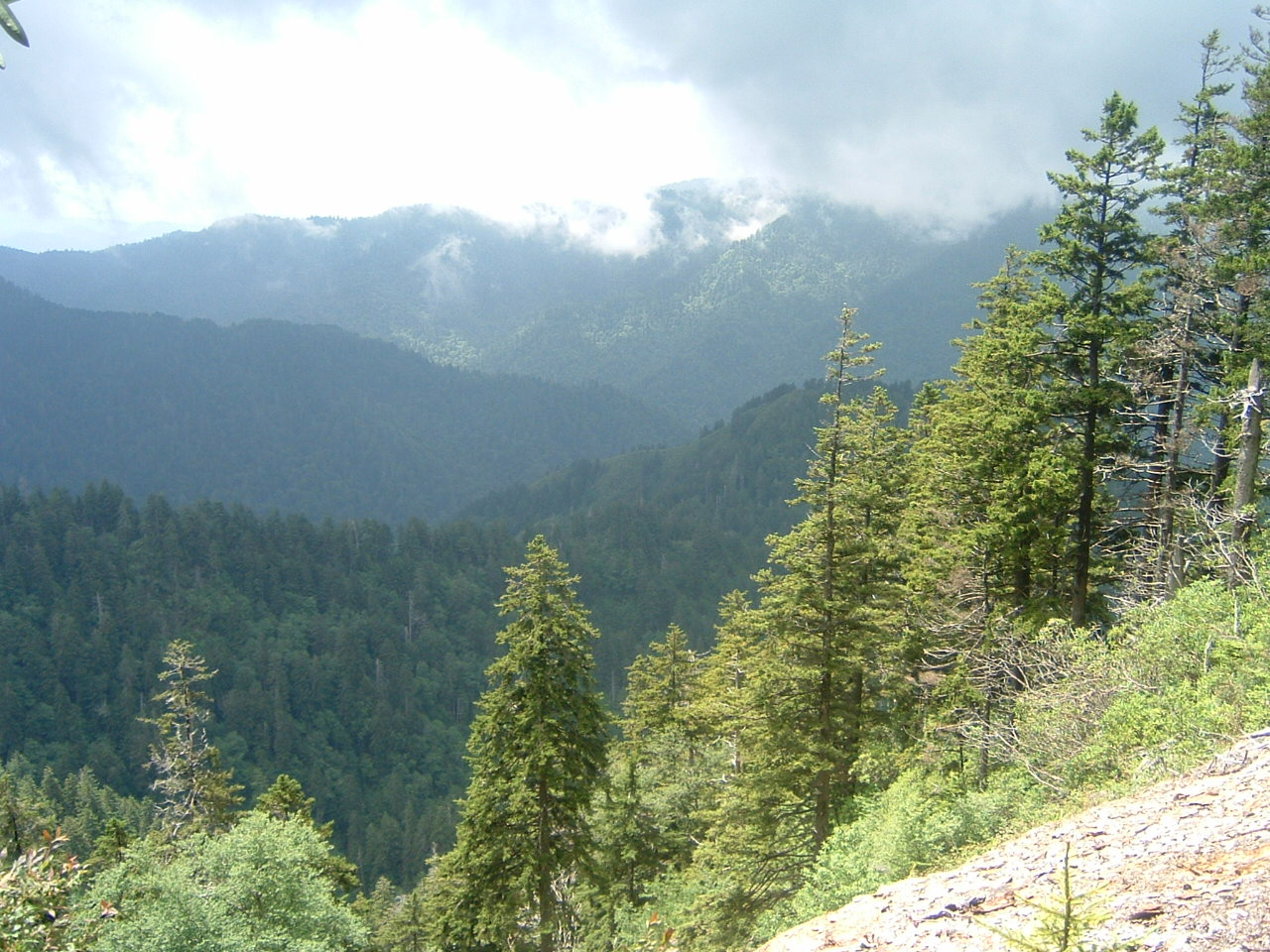
Views from Alum Cave Bluff Trail

- Alum Cave Bluff Trail: The most popular of the five trails that lead to the summit of Mount Le Conte and the LeConte Lodge, the Alum Cave Bluff Trail has two parking areas which are both filled and spilt over onto the roadside. Most of the people hiking the trail do so for the unique rock formations at Arch Rock, just 1.3 miles (2.1 km) in the trail, and Alum Cave Bluff, about a mile further along. From about the 2-mile (3.2 km) point onward, the trail is one of (if not the single most) scenic trails in the national park, which, combined with its short length relative to the other Le Conte trails (5 mi or 8.0 km), makes it also the favored trail for those heading to the Le Conte massif.
- Chimney Tops Trail: Another of the very popular Newfound Gap Road trails, the Chimney Tops Trail owes much of its popularity to its short length and notoriously panoramic summit. The length, only 2.2 miles (3.5 km), however, makes for a very steep hike — so much so that many would-be hikers do not reach the summit. Once at the top, signs erected by the National Park Service remind hikers to exercise caution, not to stray beyond the peaks of the Chimney Tops, as the fame and treachery of the Chimney Tops' summit has led to numerous injuries of often careless enthusiasts.
- The Boulevard Trail: Though only 5.3 miles (8.5 km) in length, The Boulevard Trail is accessible only by trail; the closest and most common point of entry being along the Appalachian Trail from Newfound Gap, the total hike to Mount Le Conte and the LeConte Lodge amounts to 8 miles (13 km). The Boulevard is the highest path to Le Conte: it is the only Le Conte trail that begins above 4,000 feet (1,200 m), and nowhere along the route does the elevation fall below 5,500 feet (1,700 m). In addition, The Boulevard is the only trail to pass alongside High Top, the Le Conte's highest peak.
- Appalachian Trail — Newfound Gap to Charlie's Bunion: This popular dayhike leading from Newfound Gap comprises a four-mile (6.4 km) portion of the Appalachian Trail to Charlie's Bunion, from which expansive views are afforded into the surrounding mountains.
