= Lower Mount Cammerer Trail =

Hiking trail in Tennessee, United States

Coordinates: 35.7520°N 83.2049°W

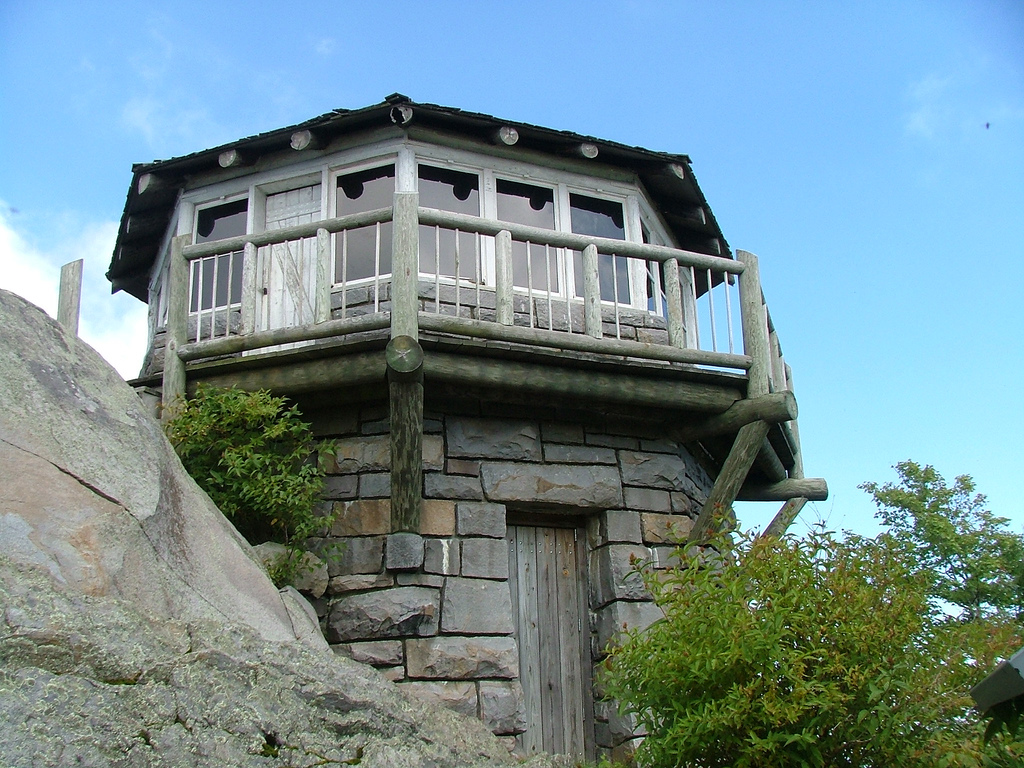
- Mount Cammerer firetower
- Length: 7.4 mi (10.3 mi. to firetower); 11.9 km (16.6 to firetower)
- Location: Great Smoky Mountains National Park, Tennessee, United States
- Trailheads: Cosby Campground, near Cosby, Tennessee, inside of the Great Smoky Mountains National Park; Terminus at junction with Appalachian Trail
- Use: Hiking
- Elevation change: 2,600 ft (792 m) to firetower
- Highest point: Junction with Appalachian Trail
- Lowest point: Trailhead at Cosby Campground
- Difficulty: Strenuous
- Season: Spring to Fall
- Sights: Cosby Creek, Sutton Ridge overlook, Mount Cammerer firetower (off trail), Great Smoky Mountains
- Hazards: Overgrown sections, climb to firetower can be tricky

The Lower Mount Cammerer Trail is an American hiking trail, in the Great Smoky Mountains National Park of Cocke County, Tennessee. The trail ascends Mount Cammerer (elev. 4,928 ft (1,502 m); 1,502 m), leading (via a connection with the Appalachian Trail) to a small, untraditional firetower at the summit, from which panoramic views of Cocke County, the main range of the Great Smoky Mountains, and the dominating presence of Mount Guyot are all prominent.

== Vital information ==
- The Lower Mount Cammerer trail extends 7.4 miles (11.9 km) towards the summit of Mount Cammerer. From there, the Appalachian Trail allows access to the summit and firetower, about 3 miles (4.8 km) further along.
- The trail is often taken as part of a joint loop hike, with the Appalachian and Low Gap trails, which lead back down to the Cosby Campground
- Mount Cammerer was named for Arno. B. Cammerer, a former director of the National Park Service (1933-1940), and proponent of the GSMNP.
- The trailhead is located in the Cosby Campground, just outside Cosby, Tennessee, inside of the Great Smoky Mountains National Park. It can be accessed by the east from Gatlinburg, Tennessee via U.S. Highway 321, or west from Interstate 40 and the Foothills Parkway.

== Landmarks/overlooks ==
- Cosby Creek
- Sutton Ridge
- Mount Cammerer firetower (via Appalachian Trail)

== Trail synopsis ==
=== Trailhead to Appalachian Trail junction ===
The hike begins along a gravel road in the Cosby Campground, which fords over Cosby Creek and beyond the Cosby Stables. After crossing over a few more small creeks, at 0.6-mile (0.97 km), the trail turns off the road and onto a familiar footpath as it begins its ascent of Mount Cammerer. After a mile of steady–but gentle–climbing, the trail descends to rock-hop Tom Creek, a subsidiary of Cosby Creek. Just beyond the creek the trail rises again to top Sutton Ridge. There, a very short side trail offers magnificent views of the Cosby Valley below. For the next 2 and a half miles the trail continues in a similar pattern of dives into tiny creek crossings and subsequent climbs over said creeks, slowly gaining altitude along the way. At 3.6 miles (5.8 km) the trail passes by Campsite #35, where, with a permit obtained from the national park, hikers can spend the night on Mount Cammerer above the Cosby Valley. As the hiker continues to mount Cammerer Ridge for the next four miles (6 km) or so, a few more streams lie ahead to be rock-hopped, but there's nothing the hiker doesn't have the experience to conquer by this point. From here the hiker reaches the junction with the Appalachian Trail, where the Lower Mount Cammerer Trail technically comes to an end, after 7.4 miles (11.9 km). The AT can be taken either left to Davenport Gap, or right to the Mount Cammerer firetower.

=== Appalachian Trail junction to Mount Cammerer firetower ===
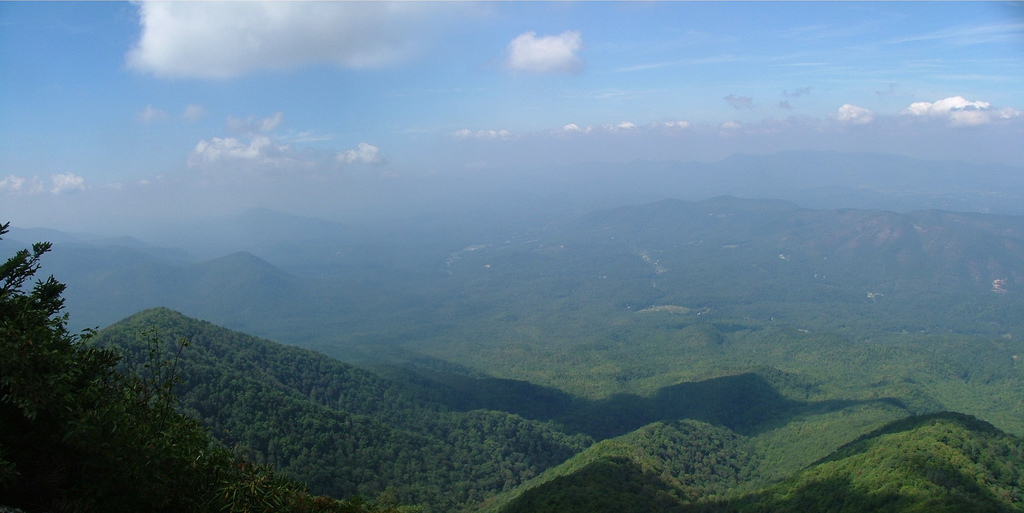
View from the firetower to the northwest

For the purposes of this trip, the hiker should turn right and head for the firetower. Along this short segment, the trail passes through a hardwood forest and eventually into the spruce-fir zone. There are some sparse views through the tree cover here, but, for the most part, this portion of the trail is enjoyed for its peacefulness and as a cool retreat during the often balmy Tennessee summer. At 2.3 miles (3.7 km), the AT reaches an 0.6-mile (0.97 km) spur trail, the final leg of the journey, to the firetower its beamy views. This last jaunt is very rocky, and offers some nice views as it traverses over "White Rocks", a nickname for the summit of Mount Cammerer. After a few minutes of walking (sometimes climbing) over the boulders, the hiker reaches the Mount Cammerer firetower. The firetower was built by the Civilian Conservation Corps in 1930, and because of its unique structure is listed on the National Register of Historic Buildings. Panoramic views from the wrap-around deck or inside through the acrylic glass windows abound from the somewhat short, stubby tower. Of course the hiker can follow his/her path back down the mountain if s/he chooses, but the return trip is often taken as a 15.5-mile (24.9 km) loop, whereby the hiker returns to the Appalachian Trail and continues on past the firetower spur, to a junction with the Low Gap Trail at Low Gap. From here it is 2.5 miles (4.0 km) back down to the Cosby Campground parking area.

== Maps and Directions ==
"Great Smoky Mountains National Park: Maps".

=== Topographic Maps ===
The Lower Mount Cammerer Trail is shown on the following 1:24,000-scale topographic maps published by the National Park Service:

"Hartford Quadrangle, Great Smoky Mountains 7.5 minute 1:24,000-scale series Topographic Maps" (PDF).

== Sources ==
Manning, Russ; Sondra Jamieson (1991). The Best of the Great Smoky Mountains National Park: A Hikers Guide to Trails and Attractions. Norris, Tennessee: Mountain Laurel Place. ISBN 0-9625122-2-2.

Brewer, Carson (1962). Hiking in the Great Smokies. Norris, Tennessee: Newman/National.
