= Laurel Falls Trail =

Hiking trail in Tennessee, United States

Coordinates: 35.6720°N 83.5805°W

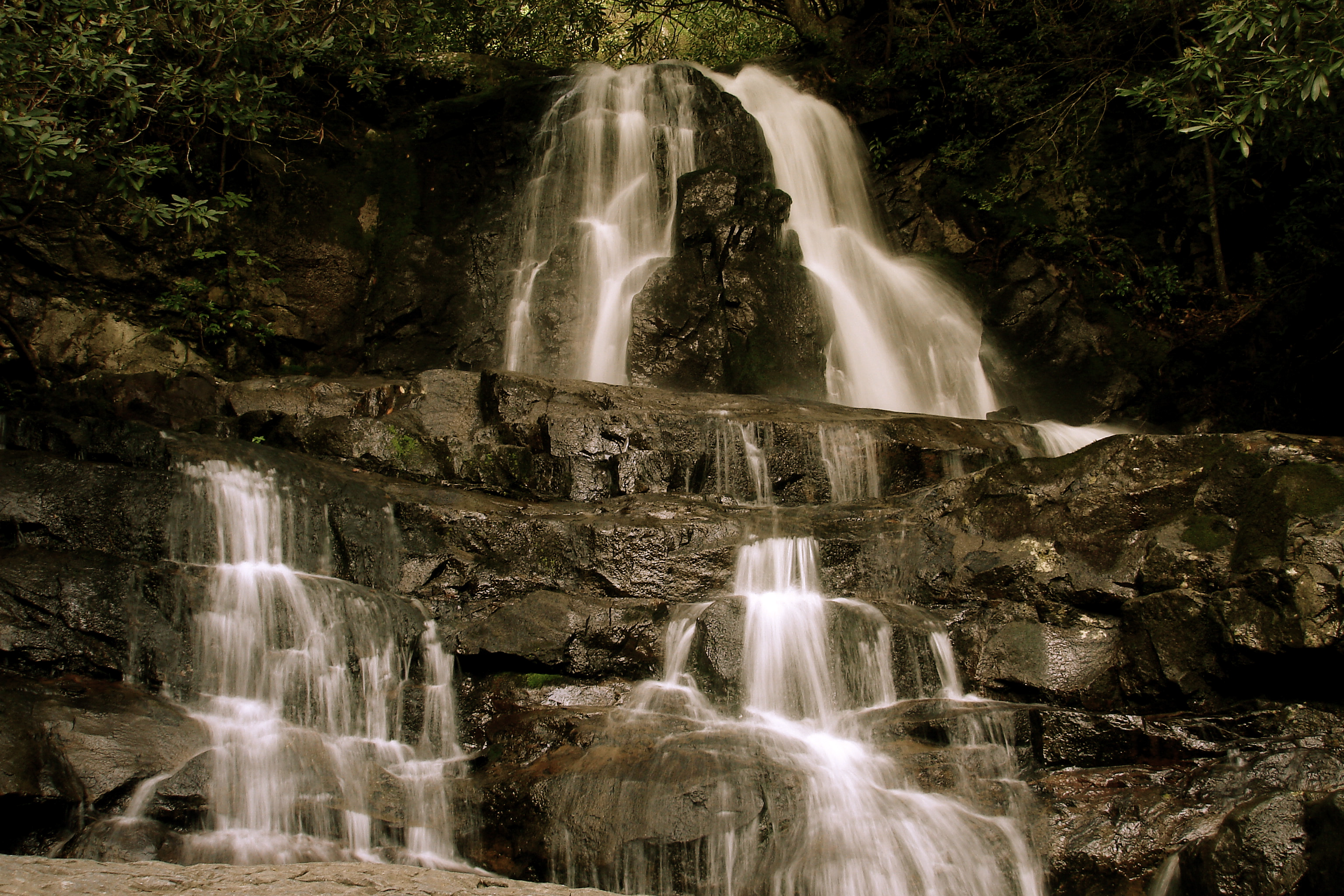
- Laurel Falls in August 2009.
- Length: 2.6 mi (1.3 to Laurel Falls); 6.4 km (2.1 to Laurel Falls)
- Location: Great Smoky Mountains National Park, Tennessee, United States
- Trailheads: Fighting Creek Gap, near Gatlinburg, Tennessee, inside of the Great Smoky Mountains National Park, off Little River Road; Terminus at junction with Cove Mountain Trail
- Use: Hiking
- Elevation change: 1,800 ft (550 m)
- Highest point: Junction with Cove Mountain Trail
- Lowest point: Trailhead at Fighting Creek Gap
- Difficulty: Easy (to falls); Moderate (to lookout tower)
- Season: Any
- Sights: Laurel Falls, Old-growth forest, Cove Mountain lookout tower, Great Smoky Mountains
- Hazards: Waterfall crossing, lookout tower unsafe to climb

The Laurel Falls Trail is an American hiking trail, in the Great Smoky Mountains National Park of Sevier County, Tennessee. The trail ascends Cove Mountain (elev. 4,077 ft (1,243 m); 1,372 m), leading past Laurel Falls, one of the most popular waterfalls in the national park, en route to the summit of Cove Mountain and the Cove Mountain fire tower.

== Vital information ==
- The Laurel Falls Trail is paved over the first 1.3 miles (2.1 km) of its course, where it runs just in front of Laurel Falls, the single most popular attraction via trail in the national park.
- The historic lookout tower at the end of the trail is generally not considered safe to climb. This tower used to be a fire tower, and is only one of four remaining former fire towers in the park.
- The trailhead is located off Fighting Creek Gap Road inside the Great Smoky Mountains National Park, less than four miles (6 km) from the park headquarters at the Sugarlands Visitor Center.

== Landmarks/overlooks ==
- Laurel Falls
- Old-growth forest
- Cove Mountain lookout tower

== Trail synopsis ==
=== Trailhead to Laurel Falls ===
The Laurel Falls Trail is a worn down path in the entire national park– at least to the waterfall. Because of this the national park service has had to pave this segment trail with a dark concrete, so as to prevent further erosion of the trailside. There once were wooden posts at every 0.1-mile (0.16 km), giving the many visitors who walk the 1.3 miles (2.1 km) to Laurel Falls an indicator of just how far they have to go. As of October 2024, there are no distance or elevation markers over this section of the trail. The paved section of the path, while often very crowded, does offer a nice, gentle walk in the woods, accessible to most children, and inasmuch has been designated as a nature trail by the park service. The second-growth forest is rather thick over this period, and is often decorated with a thick laurel thrush, for which the Laurel Branch and her signature waterfall are named. As the hiker approaches the falls, s/he should begin to hear the roars of both tumbling waters and a host of visitors who have made the trip to the surprisingly powerful cascade. Laurel Falls is an 80-foot (25m) multi-level waterfall. The trail crosses over the midsection of the waterfall via a bridge, as the gushing waterfall sprays mist overhead and dives into a narrow gorge below. Although much has been mentioned of how heavily trafficked the trail can be at times, the waterfall is popular for a reason: it is one of the most magnificent in the national park.

=== Laurel Falls to Cove Mountain lookout tower ===
When one stops to consider how wildly popular the short trail to the waterfall is, s/he may wonder whether most patrons to Laurel Falls even realize that the trail does continue on beyond the point where it is no longer paved. In fact, the trail enters into one of the most pristine forests in the national park just about a mile past the falls. The old-growth forest here was never logged (as most forests in the area were), most likely due to the difficulty in transporting materials to and from the isolated region. At the 3.1-mile (5.0 km) point, the trail comes to a junction with the Little Greenbrier Trail and continues on along the crest of the Chinquapin Ridge to the top of Cove Mountain. Here, the path comes to an old dirt road, which leads a few hundred yards to the Cove Mountain lookout tower. The tower once allowed visitors views into the surrounding mountainside of the Great Smoky Mountains but is no longer considered safe to mount. It is, however, one of only three remaining lookout towers in the park (not including the fire tower of Mount Cammerer), the other two being at Mount Sterling and Shuckstack. It is back on the main path here that the trail ends, at a junction with the Cove Mountain Trail, which leads back down to the Sugarlands Visitor Center and the park headquarters.

== Maps and Directions ==
"Great Smoky Mountains National Park: Plan Your Visit: Laurel Falls". Archived from the original on May 11, 2012.

"Great Smoky Mountains National Park: Maps".

== Sources ==
- Manning, Russ; Sondra Jamieson (1991). The Best of the Great Smoky Mountains National Park: A Hikers Guide to Trails and Attractions. Norris, Tennessee: Mountain Laurel Place. ISBN 0-9625122-2-2.
- Brewer, Carson (1962). Hiking in the Great Smokies. Norris, Tennessee: Newman/National.
