= Alum Cave Trail =

Hiking trail in Tennessee, United States

Coordinates: 35°38.31′N 83°26.77′W

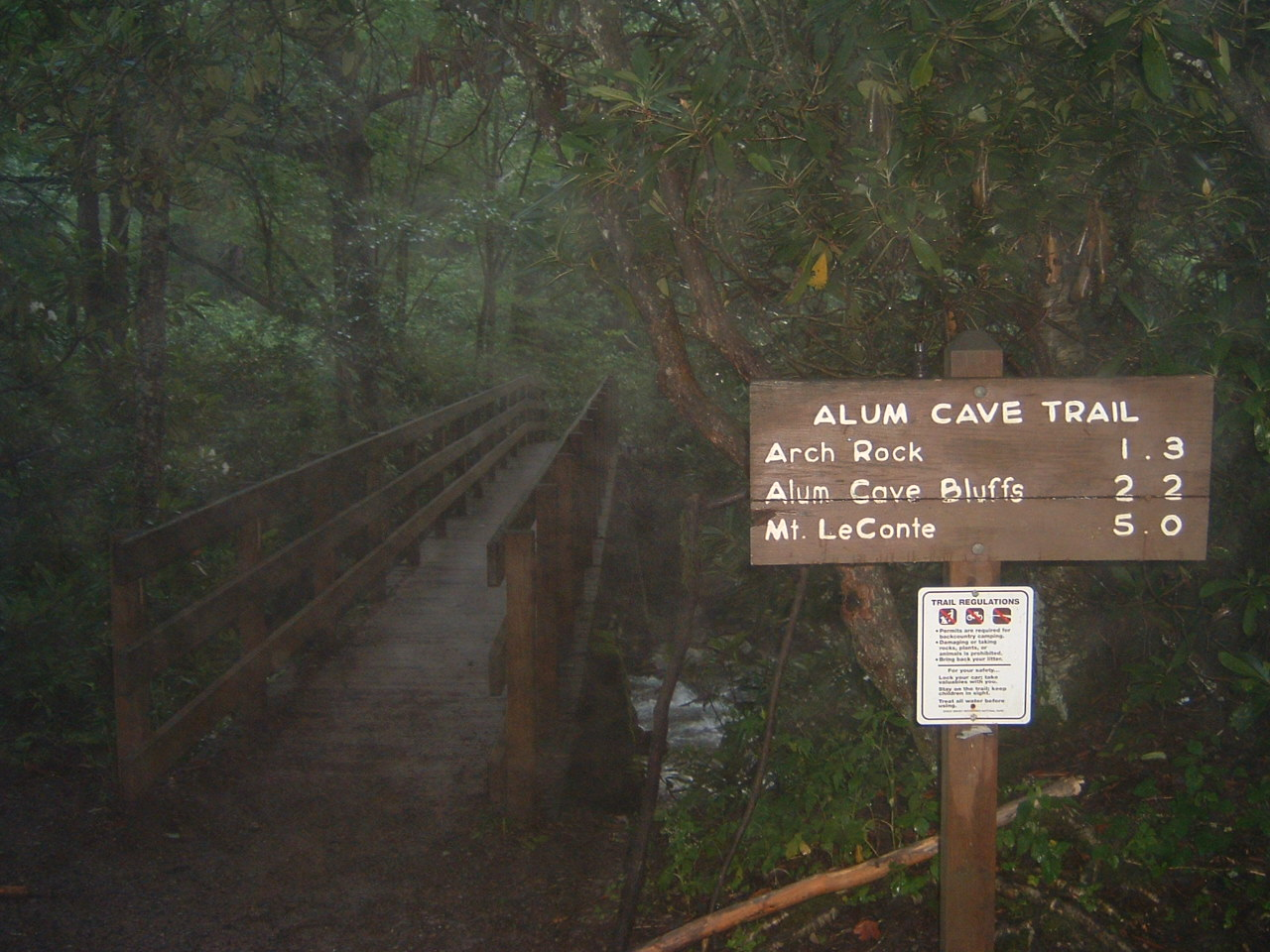
- The trailhead of the Alum Cave Trail
- Length: 5.0 mi (8.0 km)
- Location: Great Smoky Mountains National Park, Tennessee, U.S.
- Trailheads: Mount Le Conte, Tennessee (Trailhead near Walker Camp Prong off U.S. Highway 441); Terminus at junction with the Rainbow Falls Trail
- Use: Hiking
- Elevation change: 2,700 ft (820 m)
- Highest point: Junction with the Rainbow Falls Trail
- Lowest point: Trailhead at Walker Camp Prong
- Difficulty: Moderately strenuous
- Season: Spring to Fall
- Sights: Arch Rock, Alum Cave Bluff, Great Smoky Mountains
- Hazards: Ice (in winter), loose rocks

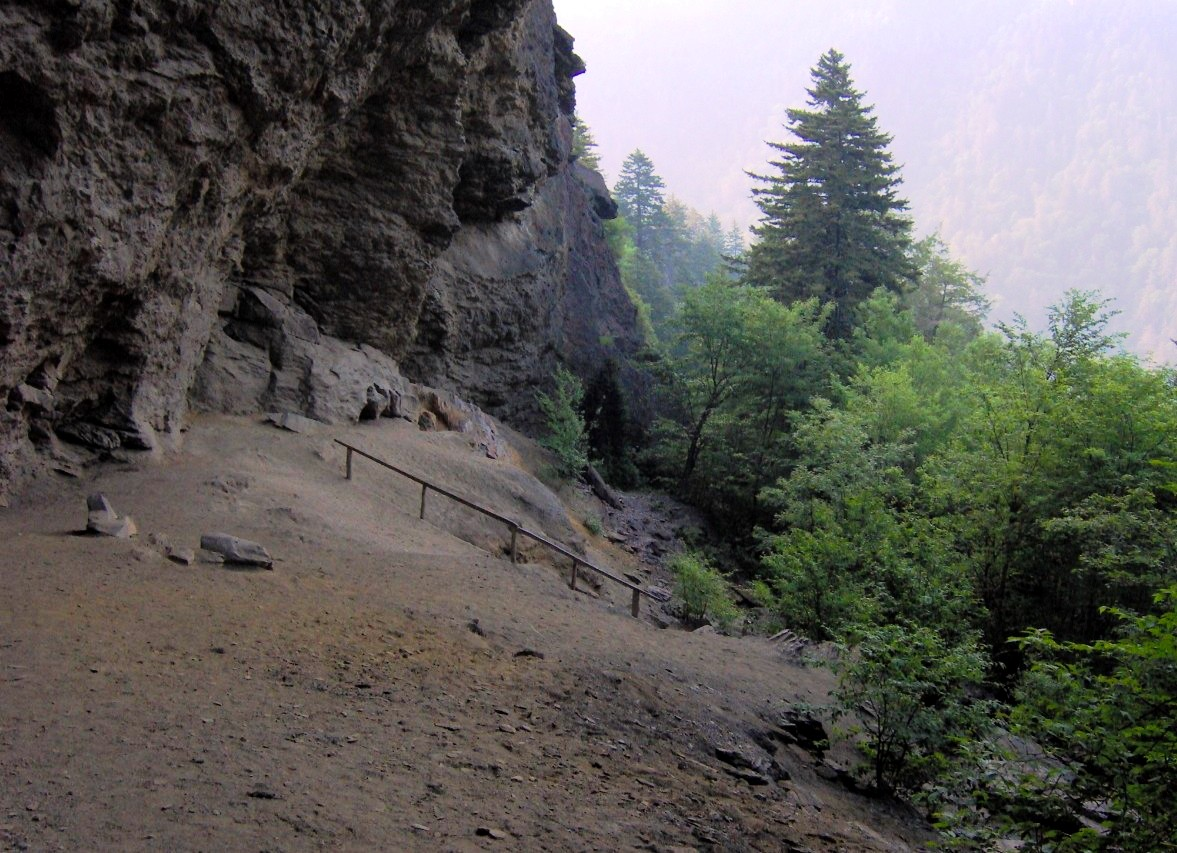
The Alum Cave Bluffs

The Alum Cave Trail, also known as Alum Cave Bluff Trail, is a hiking trail in the Great Smoky Mountains National Park, in Sevier County, Tennessee. The trail ascends Mount Le Conte, the sixth highest mountain east of the Mississippi River, and passes by many notable landmarks, such as Arch Rock, Inspiration Point, and the Duckhawk Peaks before merging with Rainbow Falls Trail near the summit.

== History ==
The first recorded account of Alum Cave goes back to 1837 when three farmers, Ephraim Mingus, Robert Collins, and George W. Hayes from the Oconaluftee Indian Village in the Great Smoky Mountains applied at the Sevier County (Tennessee) Land Office for a grant of a 50-acre (200,000 m^{2}) tract of land that would include Alum Cave and its salt deposits. Tennessee sold the tract of land to the three men on December 6, 1838.

The Epsom Salts Manufacturing Company was formed to mine the deposit. The materials mined were alum, magnesium sulfate, saltpeter, magnesia, and copperas. The easily accessible salts were depleted by the mid-1840s, but mining resumed during the American Civil War by the Confederate Army.

== Description ==
The Alum Cave Trail is the shortest and steepest of the five trails leading to the Le Conte massif, which contains five separate peaks in all, the highest of which has an elevation of 6,593 feet (2,010 m). Because of its short length and scenery (it is often considered Le Conte's most scenic route) it is the most common footpath for hikers seeking to reach the summit of Le Conte.

The entire trail is within Great Smoky Mountains National Park. The trailhead is 12 miles (19 km) from Gatlinburg, Tennessee, off Newfound Gap Road (U.S. Highway 441).

=== Route ===
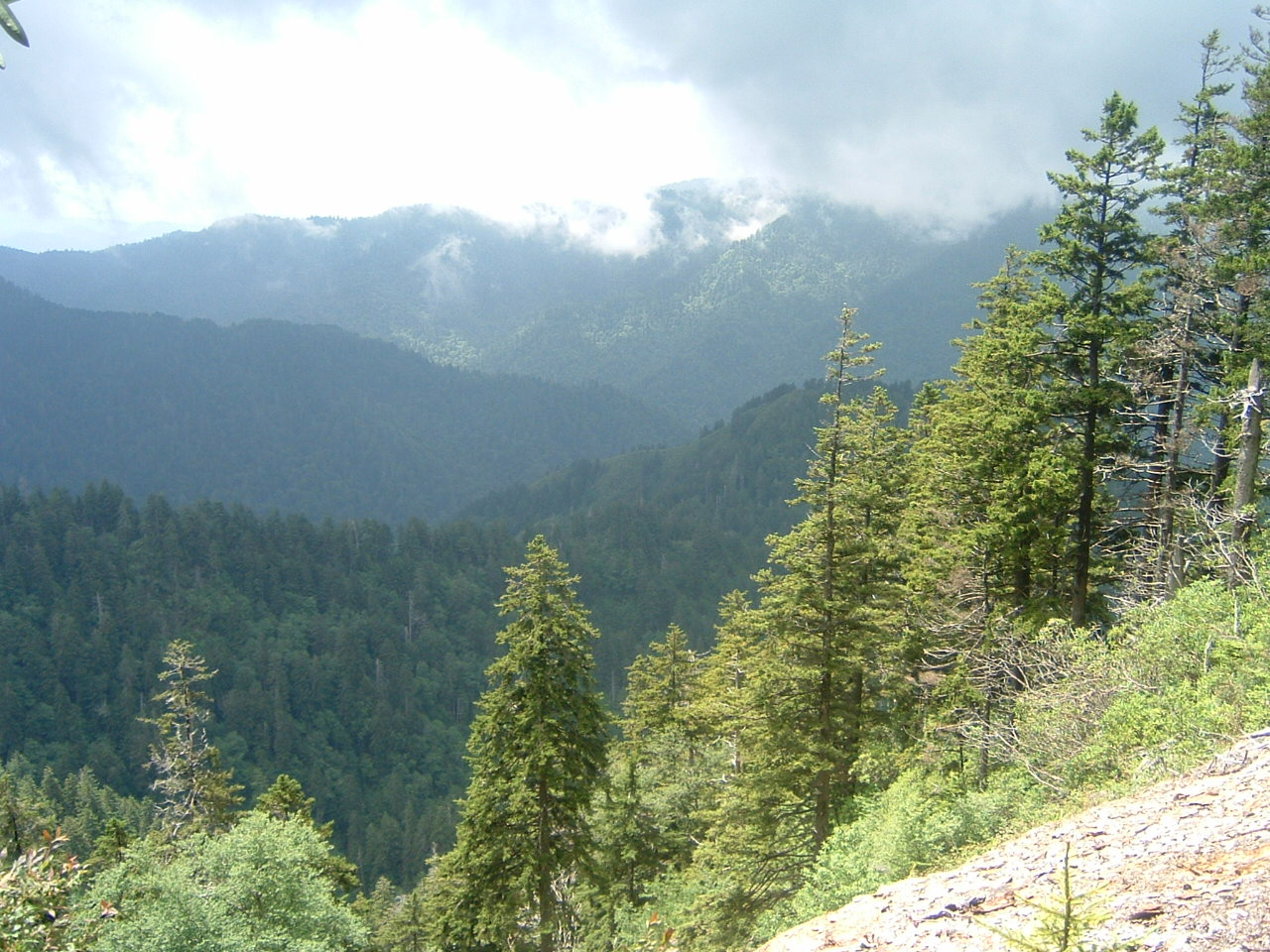
The Alum Cave Trail provides many scenic overlooks.

The trail begins its ascent at 3,834 feet (1,169 m) elevation, quickly crossing Walker Camp Prong and its tributary, Alum Cave Creek, which the trail then follows. This first leg of the trail is a gradual climb on a well maintained footpath through an old-growth forest, consisting largely of hemlock and yellow birch. The trail turns north along Styx Branch, which it follows for a short distance to Arch Rock, a large black slate rock forming a natural arch under which the trail passes. The trail climbs to Inspiration Point, an outcrop of rocks about 4,700 feet (1,400 m) in elevation, which on a clear day offers views of the surrounding landscape, most notably Little Duck Hawk Ridge. Not far from there, 2.2 miles (3.5 km) from the trail head, is Alum Cave Bluff at 4,950 feet (1,510 m) in elevation, and with sandstone cliffs 80 feet (24 m) in height.

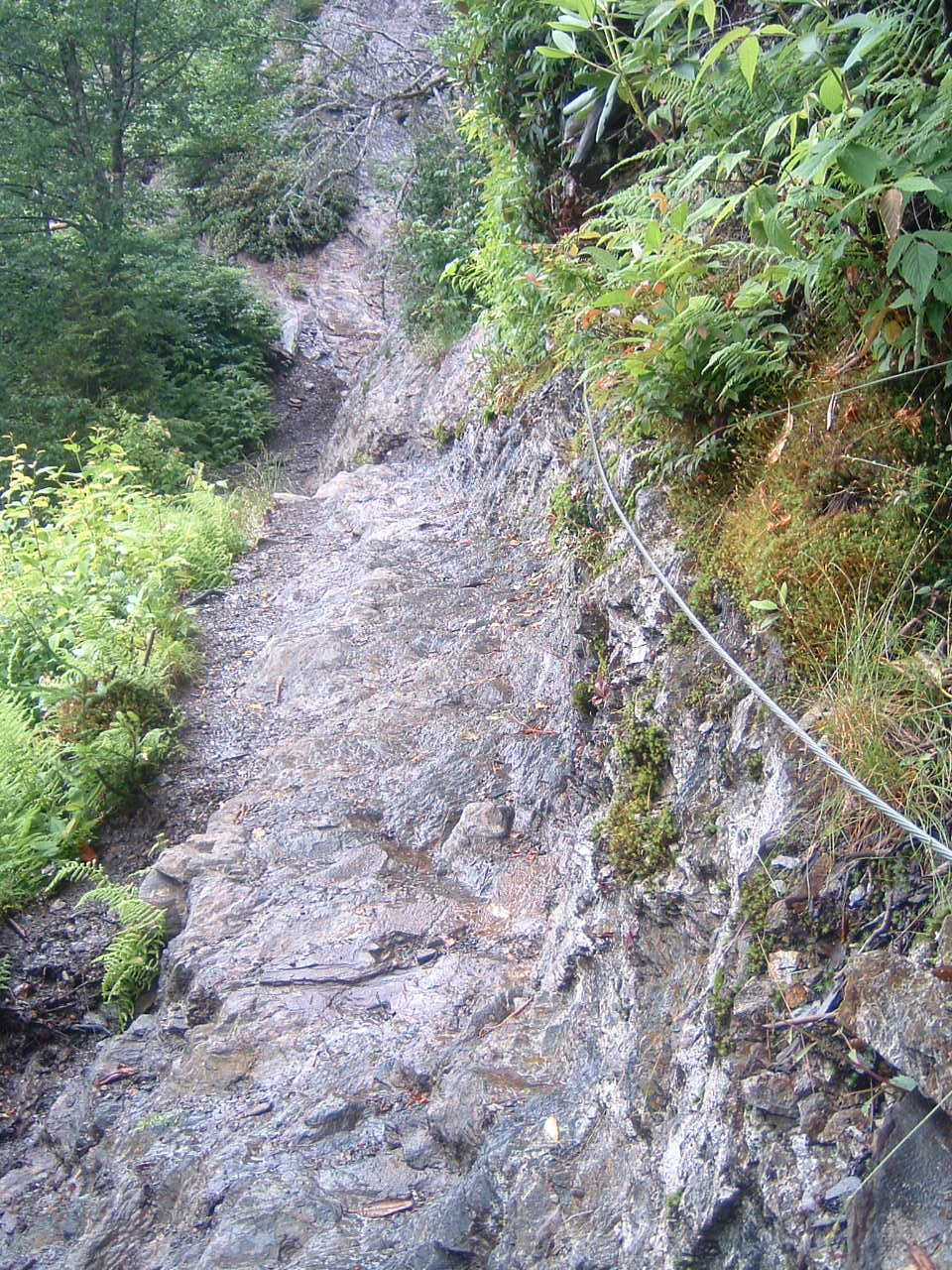
The Alum Cave Trail is very rocky and can be dangerous in wet weather.

The first half mile or so beyond the bluff is the single steepest portion of the hike, and included in this section is Gracie's Pulpit. Named for the matron of the mountain, Gracie McNichol, who famously hiked the trail on her 92nd birthday, the pulpit marks the halfway point of the Alum Cave Bluff Trail. From here the onlooker can get as clear a view as any other along the trail of the four peaks of Le Conte: West Point, Cliff Tops, High Top, and Myrtle Point.

As the trail crosses 6,000-foot (1,800 m) elevation, the landscape is dominated by dead trees, caused by balsam wooly adelgid and acid rain affecting the Fraser fir. A prolific crop of young Fraser firs grows in many of these areas. At the terminus the trail merges into the Bull Head Trail just west of the Mount LeConte Lodge. The lodge provides the only commercial lodging in the national park, as it operates about ten rustic cabins with no electricity or appliances. The actual peak of Mount Le Conte and the overlooks of Cliff Tops and Myrtle Point are a short distance from the lodge.
