= Abrams Falls Trail =

Hiking trail in Tennessee, United States

Coordinates: 35.59°N 83.85°W

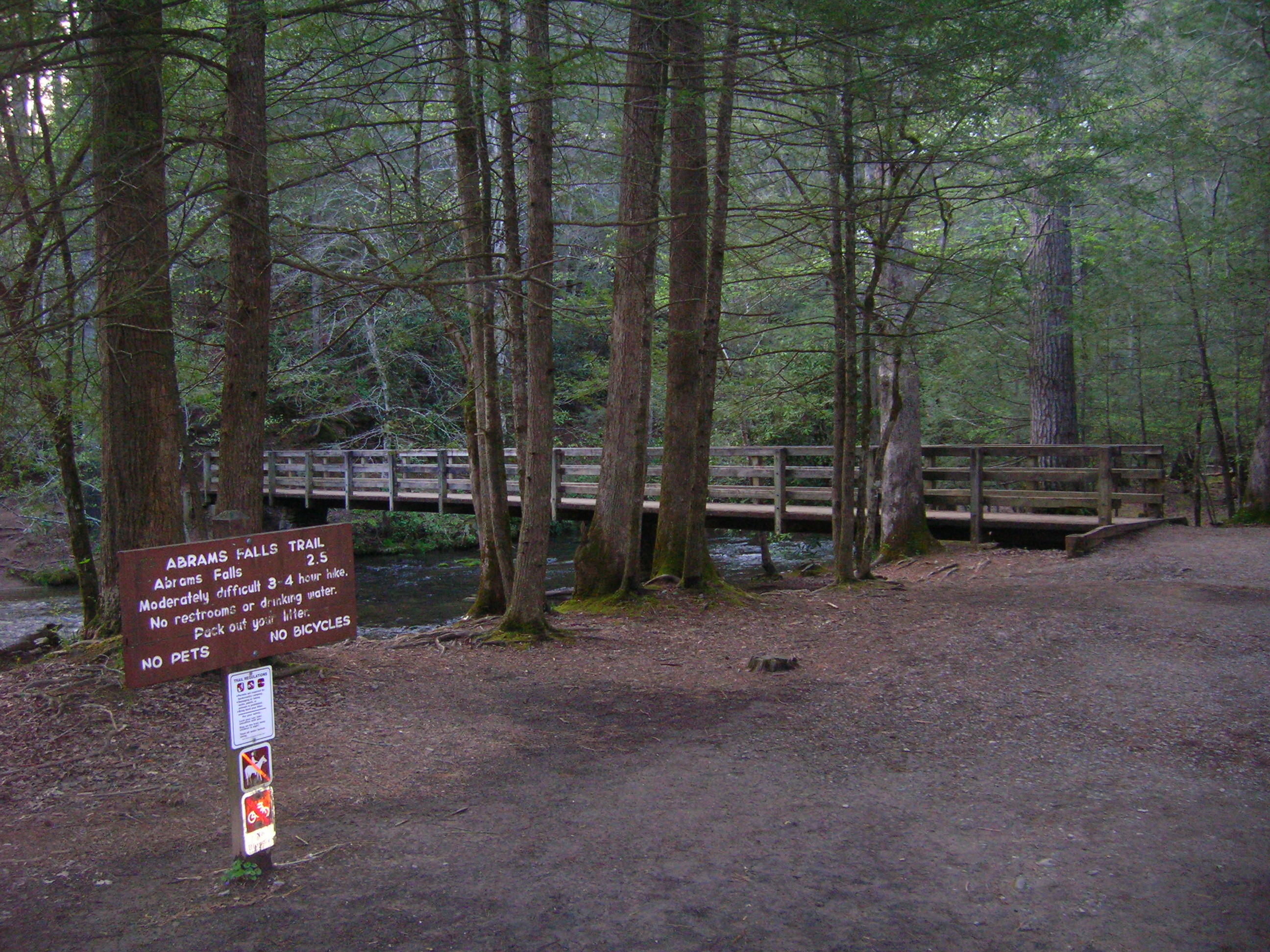
- Trailhead
- Length: 4.2 mi (2.5 to Abrams Falls); 6.8 km (4.0 to Abrams Falls)
- Location: Great Smoky Mountains National Park, Tennessee, United States
- Trailheads: Cades Cove inside of the Great Smoky Mountains National Park, off the Cades Cove Loop Road; Terminus at junction with Hannah and Hatcher Mountain Trails
- Use: Hiking, Fishing (in the creek nearby)
- Elevation change: 200 ft (61 m)
- Highest point: Junction with Hatcher and Hannah Mountain Trails
- Lowest point: Abrams Falls
- Difficulty: Moderate to Difficult (to falls); Moderate (to junction)
- Season: Any
- Sights: Abrams Creek, Abrams Falls, Great Smoky Mountains
- Hazards: Creek crossings

The Abrams Falls Trail is an American hiking trail, in the Great Smoky Mountains National Park of Blount County, Tennessee. The trail runs parallel to Abrams Creek and passes Abrams Falls, one of the most voluminous waterfalls in the national park, before terminating at a junction with the Hatcher and Hannah Mountain trails.

== Overview ==
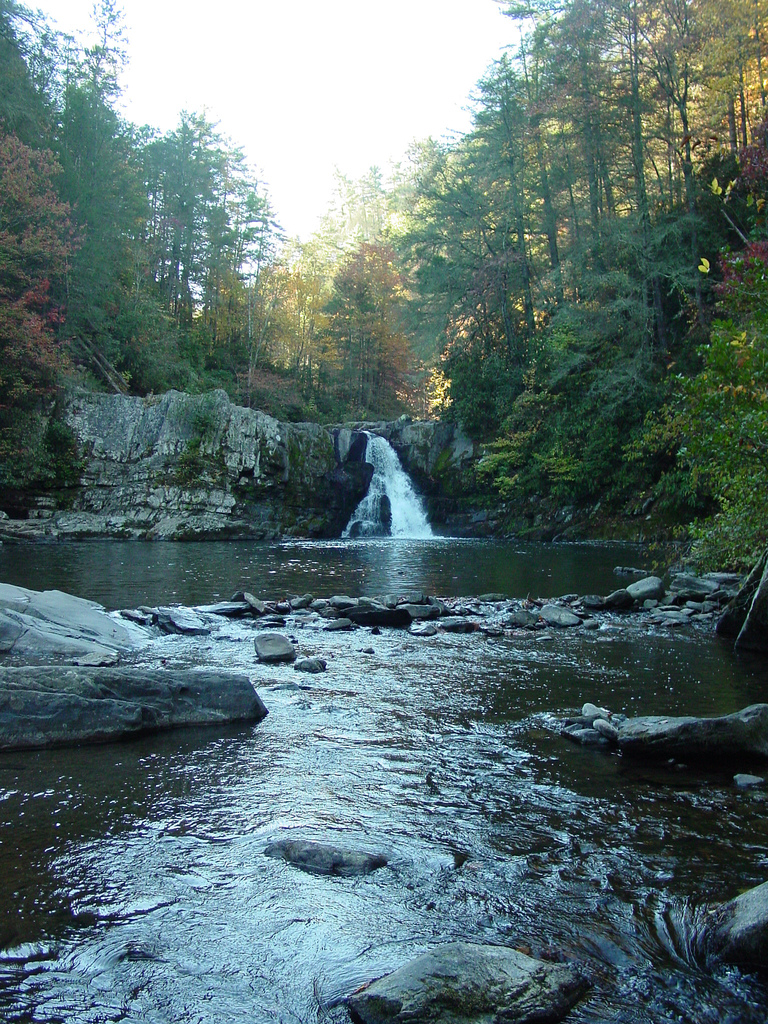
Abrams Falls

Abrams Creek, the longest stream entirely within the boundaries of the national park, follows alongside the trail for most of its length, as it plunges over Abrams Falls and into one of the largest natural pools in the area, which, during busy seasons, is often teeming with visitors swimming in its waters. The creek and waterfall were named for a Cherokee Indian Chief Oskuah, who later adopted the name Abram. The trailhead is located inside Cades Cove in the Great Smoky Mountains National Park, about 10 miles (16 km) from Townsend, Tennessee.

== Trail course ==
=== Trailhead to Abrams Falls ===
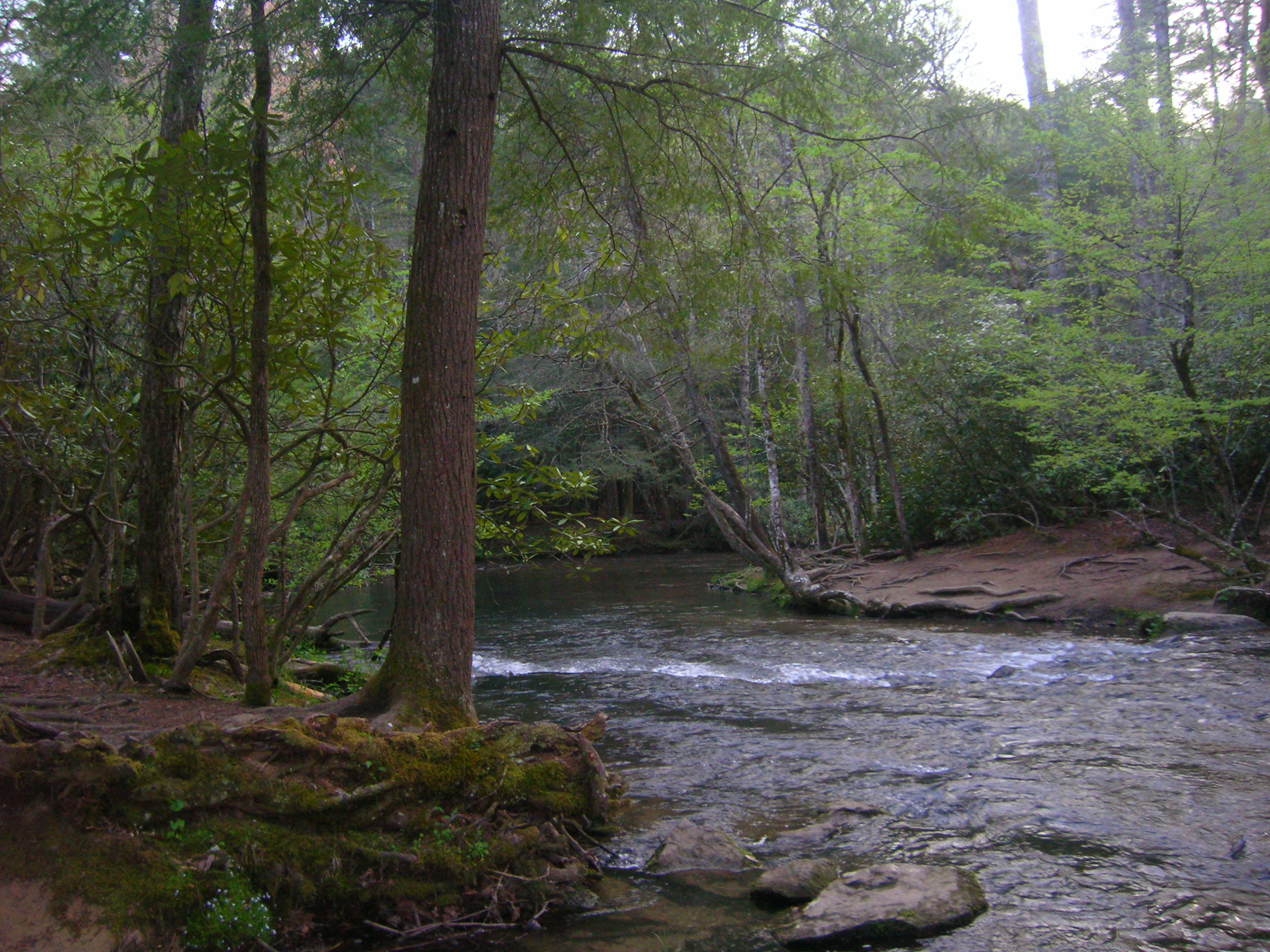
Abrams Creek is the largest creek wholly within the national park

The Abrams Falls Trail begins by immediately crossing a large wooden bridge over Abrams Creek, which follows beside the trail for most of its length. Just downstream from here Mill Creek flows into and is absorbed by Abrams, and a side trail leads about a half mile to the Elijah Oliver Place, one of the best preserved housing establishments in Cades Cove, which was once home to a number of settlers before the area was bought into the Great Smoky Mountains National Park. The Abrams Falls Trail continues beyond this point gently, only taxing hikers for short periods as the trail climbs over ridges that the creek maneuvers great distances to bypass. In fact, at Arbutus Ridge, 0.8 miles (1.3 km) down the trail, the river travels over a mile whereas the hiker traverses about two footsteps over the ridge. Most of this portion of the trail follows this same framework: gentle walking near the large stream, an uphill bout over a ridge, where the trail creek turns from the trail somewhat, but never drifts too far to be heard, and a subsequent reunion as the trail dips back down the ridge from which it came, along with a few mandatory rock-hopping creek-crossings. At 2.5 miles (4.0 km), however, this ends when the trail crosses over one more waterway, Wilson Creek, and arrives at the 20-foot (6.1 m) plunge of Abrams Falls. Abrams Falls is one of the most popular destinations in the park for its beauty and its 100-foot-wide (30 m) natural swimming pool, which is often littered with local children cooling off during the hot summer months.

=== Abrams Falls to junction with Hannah and Hatcher Mountain trails ===
This 1.7-mile (2.7 km) segment of the trail should be nearly unoccupied by other humans, as it is used rarely, at best, by hikers in the Cades Cove area. The trail here remains at the side of Abrams Creek, mounting a few more ridges and crossing over Kreider and Oak Flats Branches before arriving at a two-way junction with the Hannah and Hatcher Mountain Trails. At this juncture, the hiker can choose to continue their journey either to the left at Hannah Mountain, or upon Hatcher Mountain to the right.
