= Bullhead Trail =

Hiking trail in Tennessee, United States

Coordinates: 35.7117°N 83.5010°W

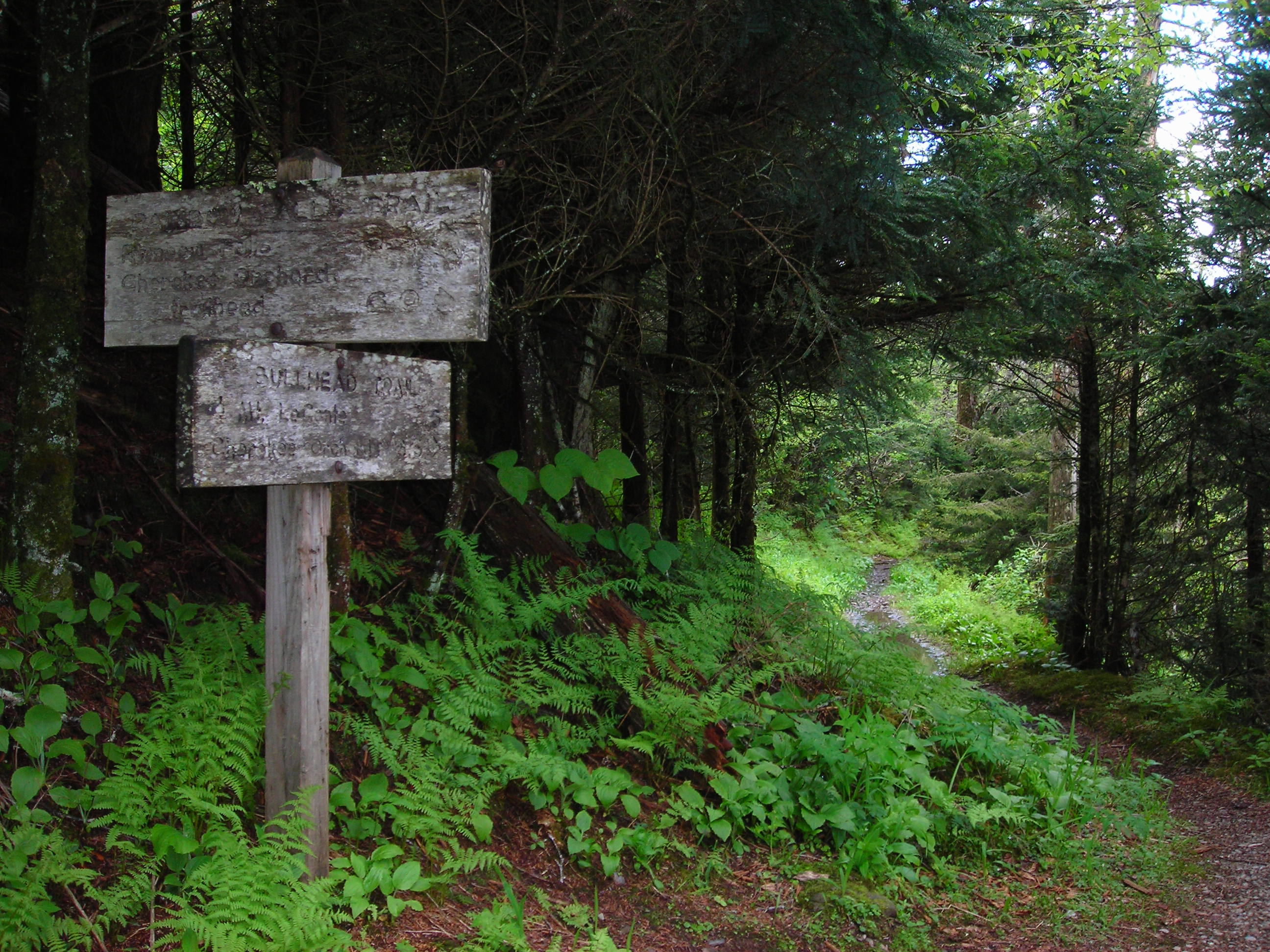
- The partition of the Bullhead and Rainbow Falls trails, two-thirds of a mile below the LeConte Lodge, showcasing Bullhead.
- Length: 5.9 (6.9 to LeConte Lodge) mi; 9.5 (11.1 to LeConte Lodge) km
- Location: Great Smoky Mountains National Park, Tennessee, United States
- Trailheads: Mount Le Conte, Tennessee (Trailhead off Cherokee Orchard Road, near Gatlinburg, Tennessee; Terminus near the LeConte Lodge
- Use: Hiking
- Elevation change: 3,820 ft (1,160 m)
- Highest point: Terminus near the LeConte Lodge
- Lowest point: Trailhead in the Sugarlands
- Difficulty: Moderately Strenuous
- Season: Spring to Fall
- Sights: Great Smoky Mountains
- Hazards: Ice (in winter), loose rocks

The Bullhead Trail is an American hiking trail in the Great Smoky Mountains National Park, in Sevier County, Tennessee. The trail ascends Mount Le Conte, the third tallest (and sixth highest) mountain east of the Mississippi River and offers outstanding views before joining the Rainbow Falls Trail before terminating near the LeConte Lodge.

== Vital information ==
- The Bullhead Trail is the least traveled route to the summit of Mount Le Conte (elev. 6,593 ft (2,010 m); 2,010 m)
- A short connector trail that extends from the Sugarlands Visitor Center to the Rainbow Falls Trail is one way to access the trailhead.
- The trailhead is located inside of the Great Smoky Mountains National Park, off Cherokee Orchard Road, 3.4 miles (5.5 km) from Gatlinburg, Tennessee.

== Landmarks/overlooks ==
- Bullhead
- English Mountain/Sugarland Mountain overlook
- Balsam Point

== Trail synopsis ==
=== Trailhead to English Mountain overlook ===
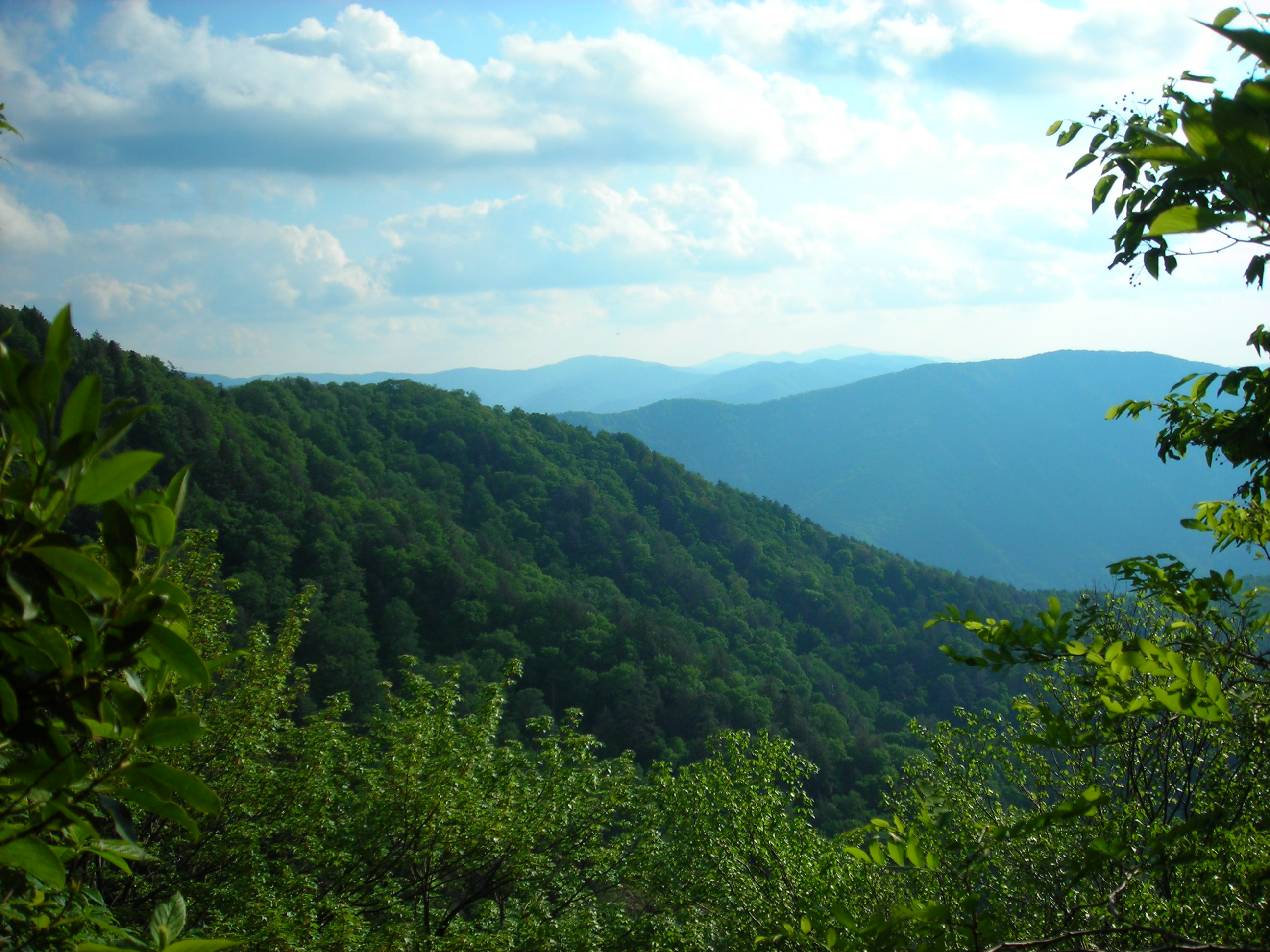
One of the many overlooks along the final portion of the Bullhead Trail.

The beginning of the Bullhead Trail is, for all intents and purposes, actually the trailhead to the Rainbow Falls Trail. Both trails are designated the same parking area, and because of their proximity (the two paths are separated only by a 0.3-mile (0.48 km) spur trail) many hikers choose to ascend one trail (usually the Rainbow Falls Trail) and descend the other. Given this, however, the trail is still the least popular route along Mount Le Conte, probably because of its isolation (in the woods, near to but away from its crowded neighbor trail) and that it contains no spectacular landmarks along its path. But it is this isolation that makes the trail so desirable to those who favor solitude when hiking.

The trail itself begins gently underneath the covering of young hemlocks, quickly offering views through the brush of a second growth forest. The first two miles (3 km) of the trail consist of much switchbacking, as the hiker slowly but steadily gains elevation towards the Le Conte summit, and includes a pass just beneath Bullhead, a Le Conte heath bald which, from a distance, apparently gives the impression of a bull's head, from which the trail is named. At 2.5 miles (4.0 km) a boulder field offers the hiker a glimpse into the Le Conte Creek valley below, even offering views of the Space Needle in downtown Gatlinburg. The path then switches back over Bullhead and continues along toward the top of the mountain when it passes a large boulder directly to the left of the trail at 3.0 miles (4.8 km). On a clear day, the hiker can see magnificent views of both English and Sugarland mountains to the northeast and southwest respectively. The rock is large enough to provide a suitable resting place close to the halfway mark of the trail.

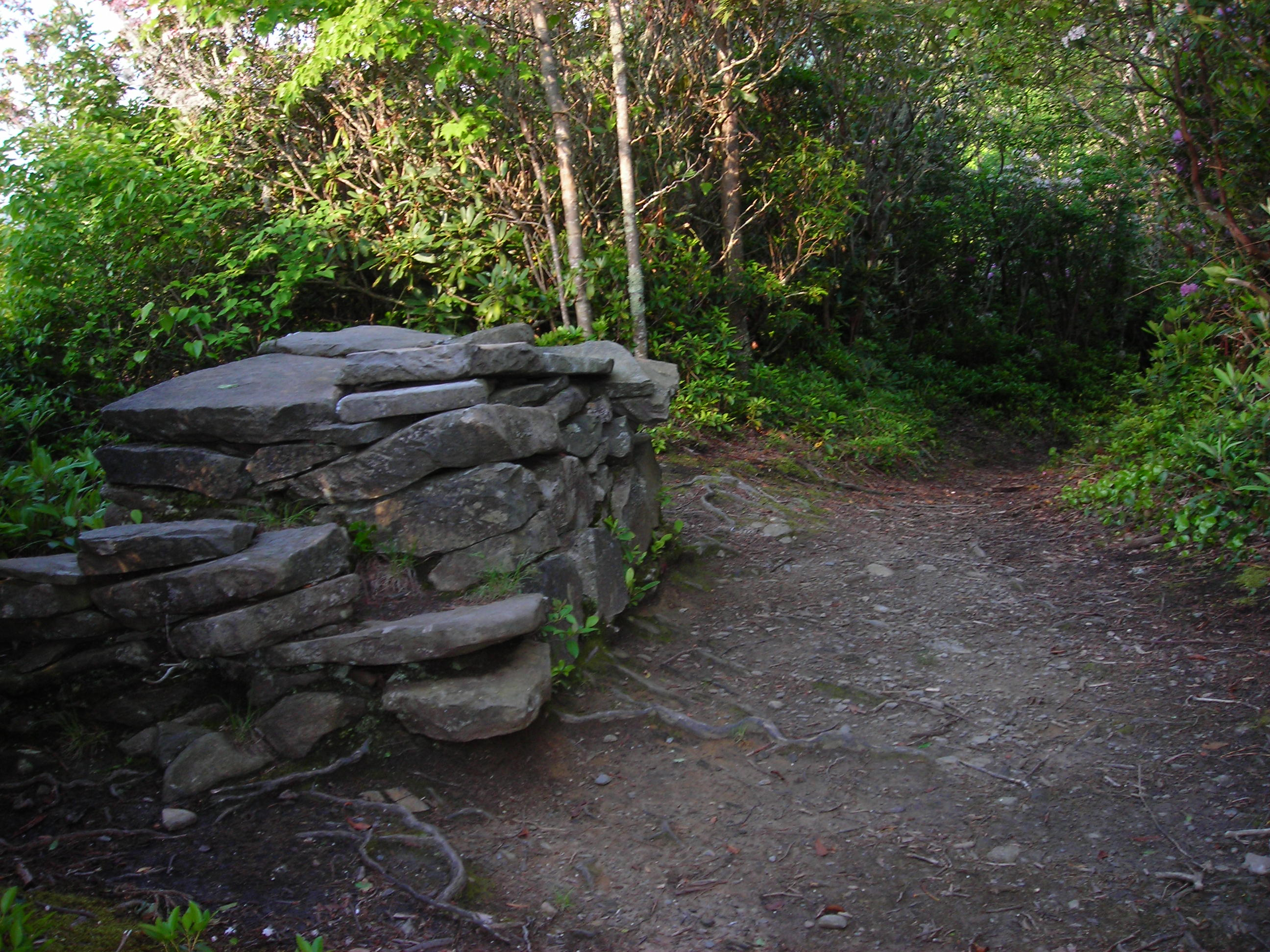
Platform nearly halfway along Bullhead Trail from which English and Sugarland mountains can be seen.

=== English Mountain overlook to the Leconte Lodge ===
Moving along toward the LeConte Lodge, the footpath soon becomes very rocky and enters into the coniferous Fraser fir/red spruce forest ubiquitous to the higher elevations of the national park. The dead Frasers are the unfortunate result of the influx of the non-native balsam wooly adelgid, an insect that latches on and feasts from the tree. The national park is undergoing extensive work and research in trying to save the remaining trees, but has so far had little success. The trail becomes quite strenuous for a short period as it ascends and conquers Balsam Point, at 6.0 miles (9.7 km), but, in return, it offers almost unmatched views to the left of the mountains below. Shortly hereafter the hiker arrives at the junction with the Rainbow Falls Trail, and, after the final 0.6-mile (0.97 km) jaunt, the LeConte Lodge is found immediately ahead. The LeConte Lodge provides the only commercial lodging in the national park, as it operates about 10 rustic cabins with no electricity or appliances. The Lodge also operates an office which provides t-shirts and other merchandise for hikers and various amenities for guests of the lodge. For many, this signals the end of their journey, but the actual peaks of Le Conte all have separate trails a short distance from the lodge, with Cliff Tops and Myrtle Point each offering expansive panoramas of the mountains and valleys below.

== Maps and Directions ==
"Great Smoky Mountains National Park: Maps".

=== Topographic Maps ===
The Bullhead Trail is shown on the following 1:24,000-scale topographic maps published by the National Park Service:

"Mt Le Conte Quadrangle, Great Smoky Mountains 7.5 minute 1:24,000-scale series Topographic Maps" (PDF).

== Sources ==
Manning, Russ; Sondra Jamieson (1991). The Best of the Great Smoky Mountains National Park: A Hiker's Guide to Trails and Attractions. Norris, Tennessee: Mountain Laurel Place. ISBN 0-9625122-2-2.

Elevation Information
