= Rainbow Falls Trail =

Hiking trail in Tennessee, United States

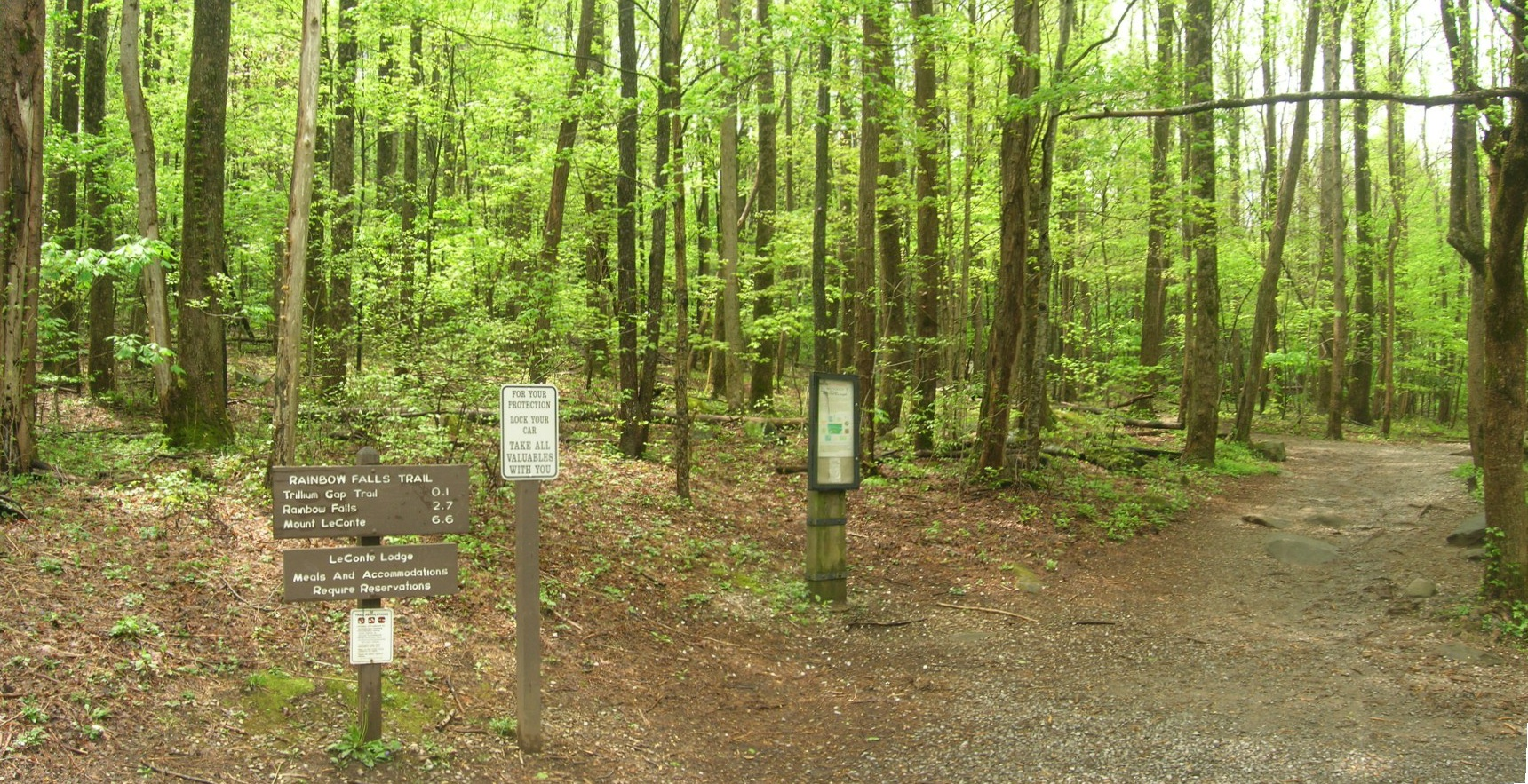
- The Rainbow Falls Trail trailhead
- Length: 5.6 mi (9.0 km)
- Location: Great Smoky Mountains National Park, Tennessee, United States
- Trailheads: Mount Le Conte, Tennessee (trailhead near LeConte Creek off Cherokee Orchard Road, near Gatlinburg, Tennessee; Terminus near the LeConte Lodge
- Use: Hiking
- Elevation change: 4,000 ft (1,200 m)
- Highest point: Terminus near the LeConte Lodge
- Lowest point: Trailhead
- Difficulty: Moderately strenuous
- Season: Spring to fall
- Sights: Rainbow Falls, Rocky Spur, Appalachian Mountains
- Hazards: Ice (in winter), loose rocks, narrow footbridges

The Rainbow Falls Trail is an American hiking trail in the Great Smoky Mountains National Park, in Sevier County, Tennessee. The trail ascends Mount Le Conte, the third tallest in the park (and sixth-highest) mountain east of the Mississippi River, and passes Rainbow Falls before absorbing the Alum Cave Trail and terminating near the LeConte Lodge.

== Information ==
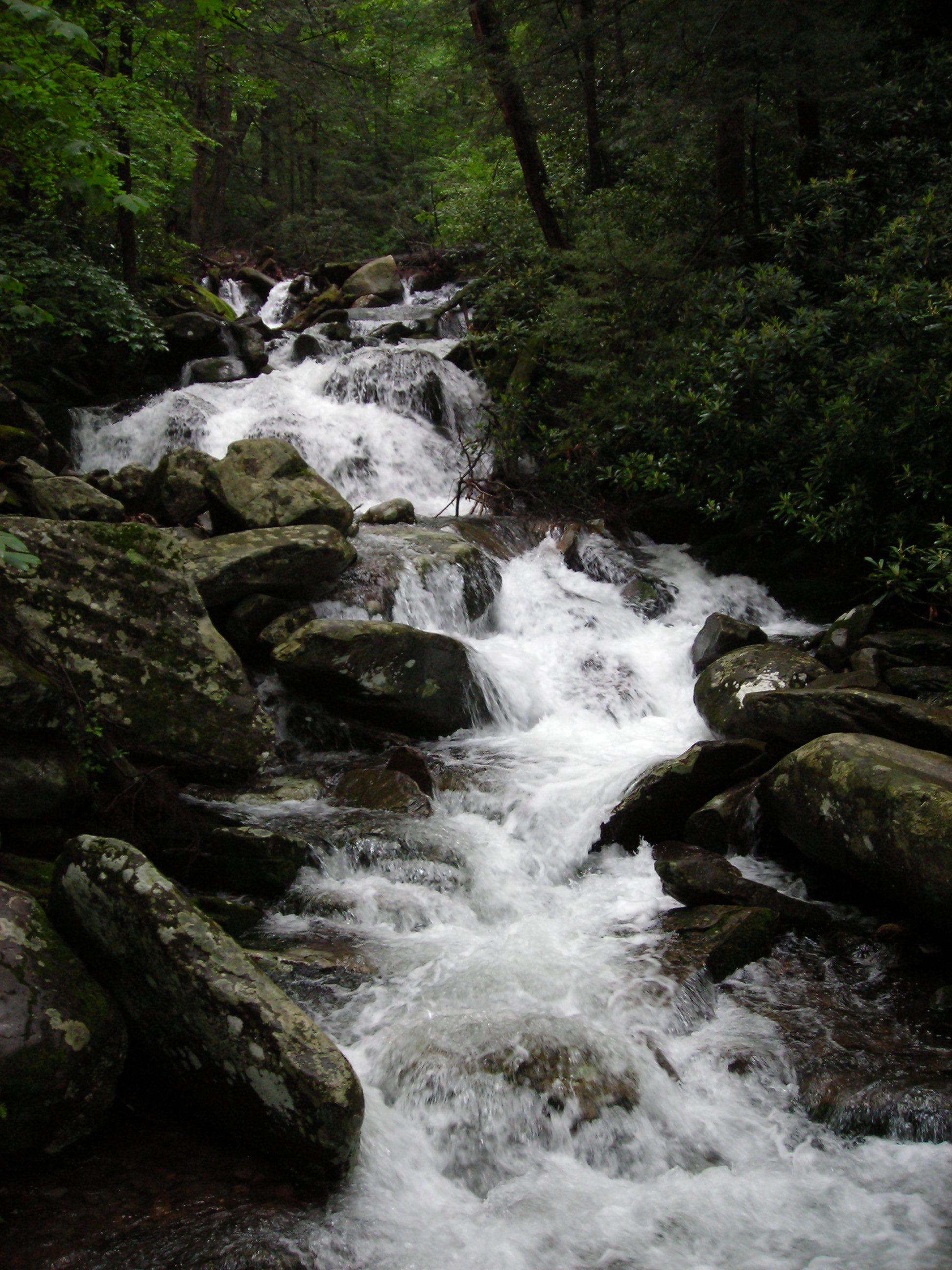
LeConte Creek after heavy rainfall

- The Rainbow Falls Trail is approximately the same as the route taken by Paul Adams as he led the first Park Commission trip to LeConte, which helped lead to the formation of the national park.
- The trailhead is located inside of the Great Smoky Mountains National Park, off Cherokee Orchard Road, 3.4 miles (5.5 km) from Gatlinburg, Tennessee.

=== Landmarks and overlooks ===
- LeConte Creek
- Rainbow Falls
- Rocky Spur

== Trail synopsis ==
=== Trailhead to Rainbow Falls ===
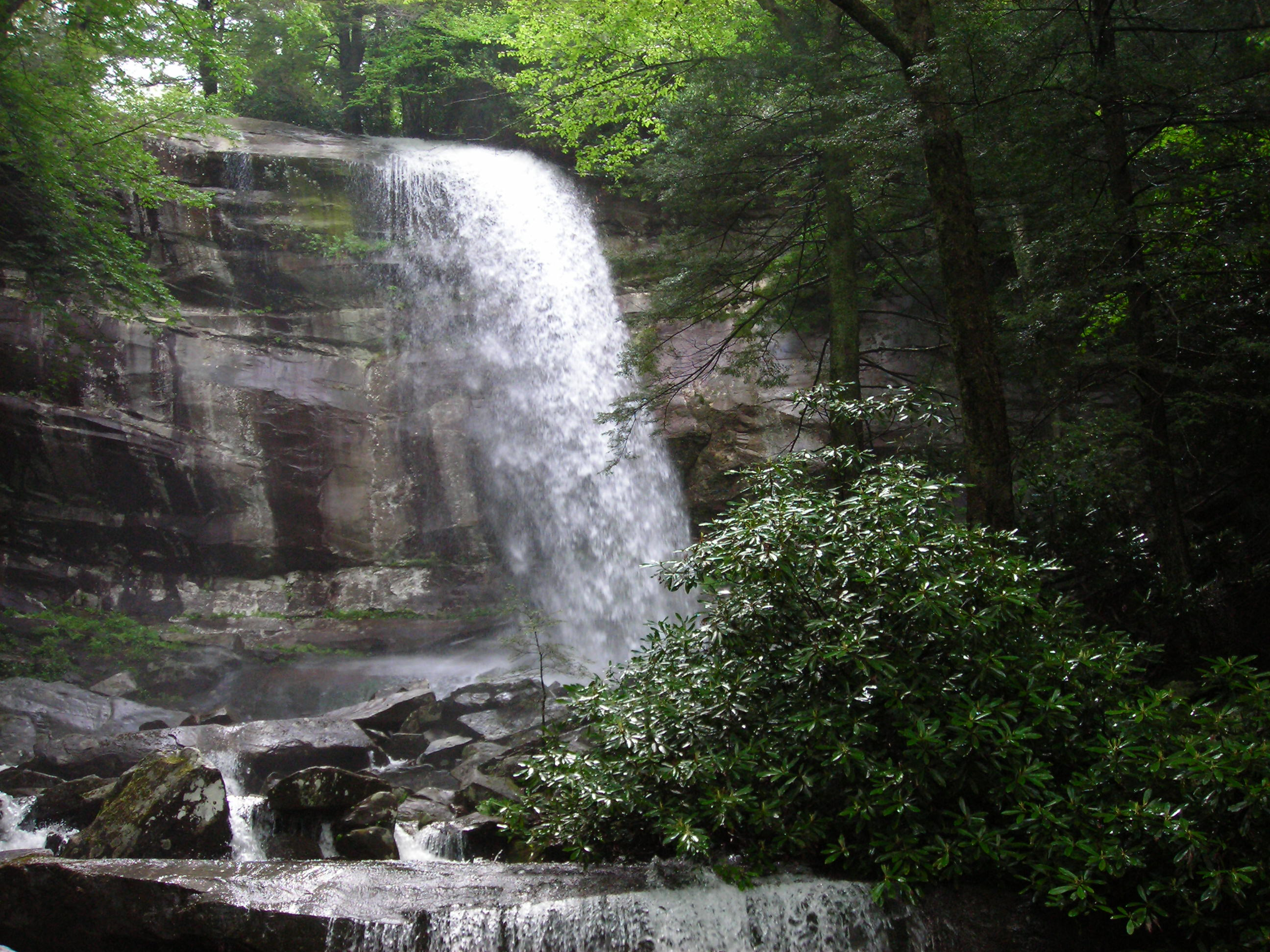
At nearly 80 feet, Rainbow Falls is the longest plunge of water in the Great Smoky Mountains National Park.

The trail asserts itself from the beginning, immediately ascending Le Conte's flank, alongside the mountain's primary drainage avenue, LeConte Creek, which, due to the abnormally large number of mills that sprouted up along this stream at one time (twelve, at its peak), was once known as "Mill Creek". The roaring sounds of the creek accompany the footpath for most of the first 2.6 miles (4.2 km), only dying down at about the 1.5-mile (2.4 km) mark, where the trail temporarily jaunts away from the stream. The path soon swings back, crossing over LeConte Creek twice via narrow footbridges over the final mile to Rainbow Falls. When hikers reach Rainbow Falls, they have hiked 2.6 miles (4.2 km) and are in the presence of the highest single-drop waterfall in the national park. On the somewhat rare occasion of a sunny afternoon at the falls, a lucky onlooker can see a rainbow reflected in the sprayed mist of the waterfall, hence the Rainbow Falls moniker.

=== Rainbow Falls to LeConte Lodge ===
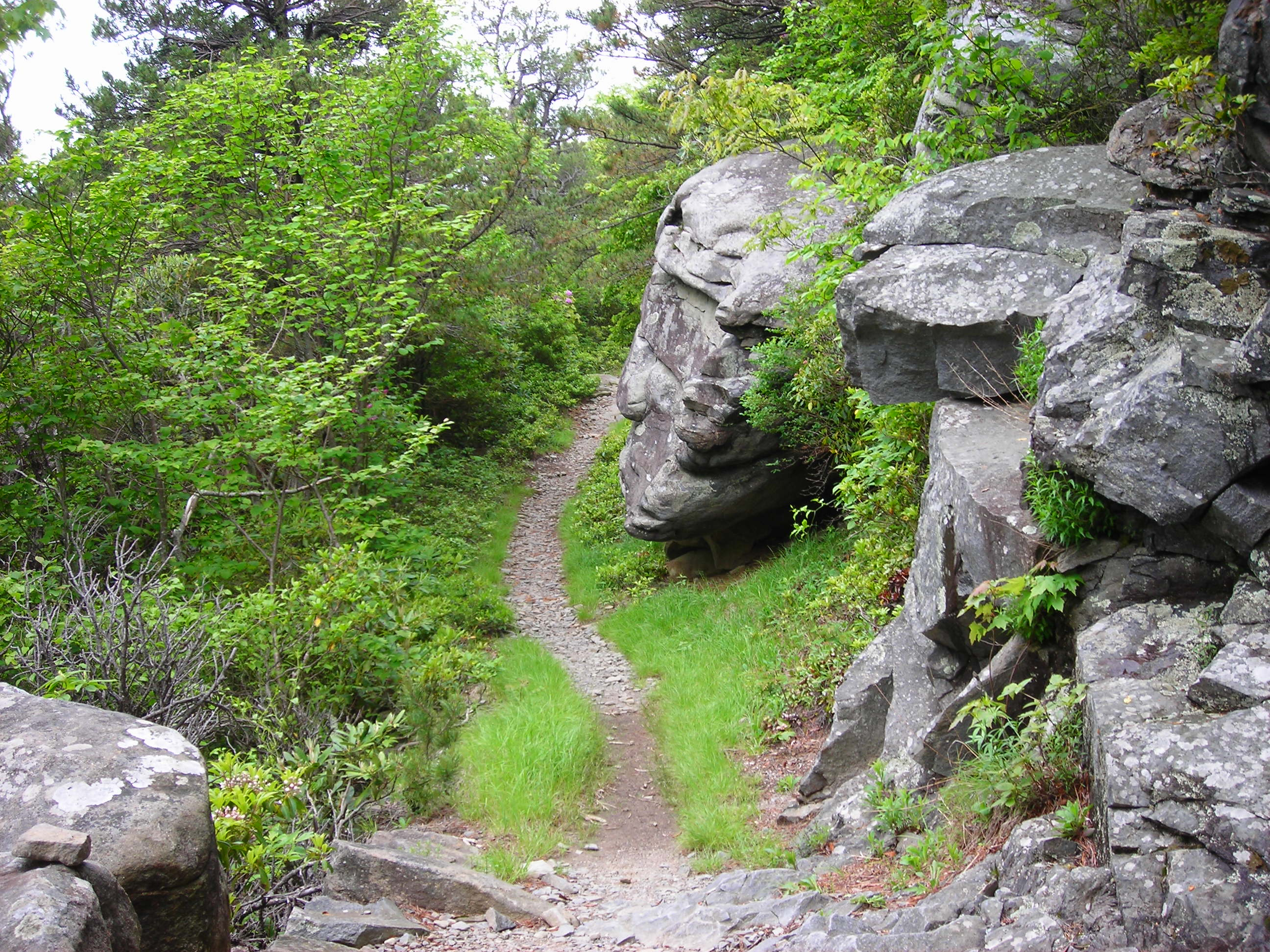
These large boulders can provide hikers some respite during the 6.5-mile (10.6 km) journey to the summit of Mount Le Conte.

From Rainbow Falls, the trail continues as a third footbridge over LeConte Creek. Over the next three miles (5 km), the trail continues its steady climb towards the lodge, cutting switchbacks through sandstone chutes, offering the trail's first scenic overlooks. Rhododendron, sand myrtle, and mountain laurel blanket the trail during this portion, offering springtime visitors a carpeting of purples, whites, and blends of pink. At 5.4 miles (8.7 km), the trail comes to Rocky Spur, an outcropping of rocks that offers splendid views of the valleys below via a short side trail which loops back to the main trail. The trail continues into a spruce fir forest, which signals the looming junction with the Bullhead Trail, at 6.0 miles (9.7 km). From that point, the now rocky trail ascends for a half mile towards LeConte Lodge. The LeConte Lodge provides the only commercial lodging in the national park, as it operates about ten rustic cabins with no electricity or appliances. The lodge also operates an office which provides T-shirts and other merchandise for hikers and various amenities for guests of the lodge. For many, this signals the end of their journey, but the actual peaks of Le Conte all have separate trails a short distance from the lodge, with Cliff Tops and Myrtle Point each offering expansive panoramas of the mountains and valleys below.

== Maps and directions ==
- "Great Smoky Mountains National Park: Plan Your Visit: Rainbow Falls".
- "Great Smoky Mountains National Park: Maps".

=== Topographic maps ===
The Abrams Falls Trail is shown on the following 1:24,000-scale topographic maps published by the National Park Service:

- "Mt Le Conte Quadrangle, Great Smoky Mountains 7.5 minute 1:24,000-scale series Topographic Maps" (PDF).

== Sources ==
- Manning, Russ; Sondra Jamieson (1991). The Best of the Great Smoky Mountains National Park: A Hiker's Guide to Trails and Attractions. Norris, Tennessee: Mountain Laurel Place. ISBN 0-9625122-2-2.
- Brewer, Carson (1962). Hiking in the Great Smokies. Knoxville, Tennessee: Newman/National.
