= Mount Cammerer =

Mountain in the United States

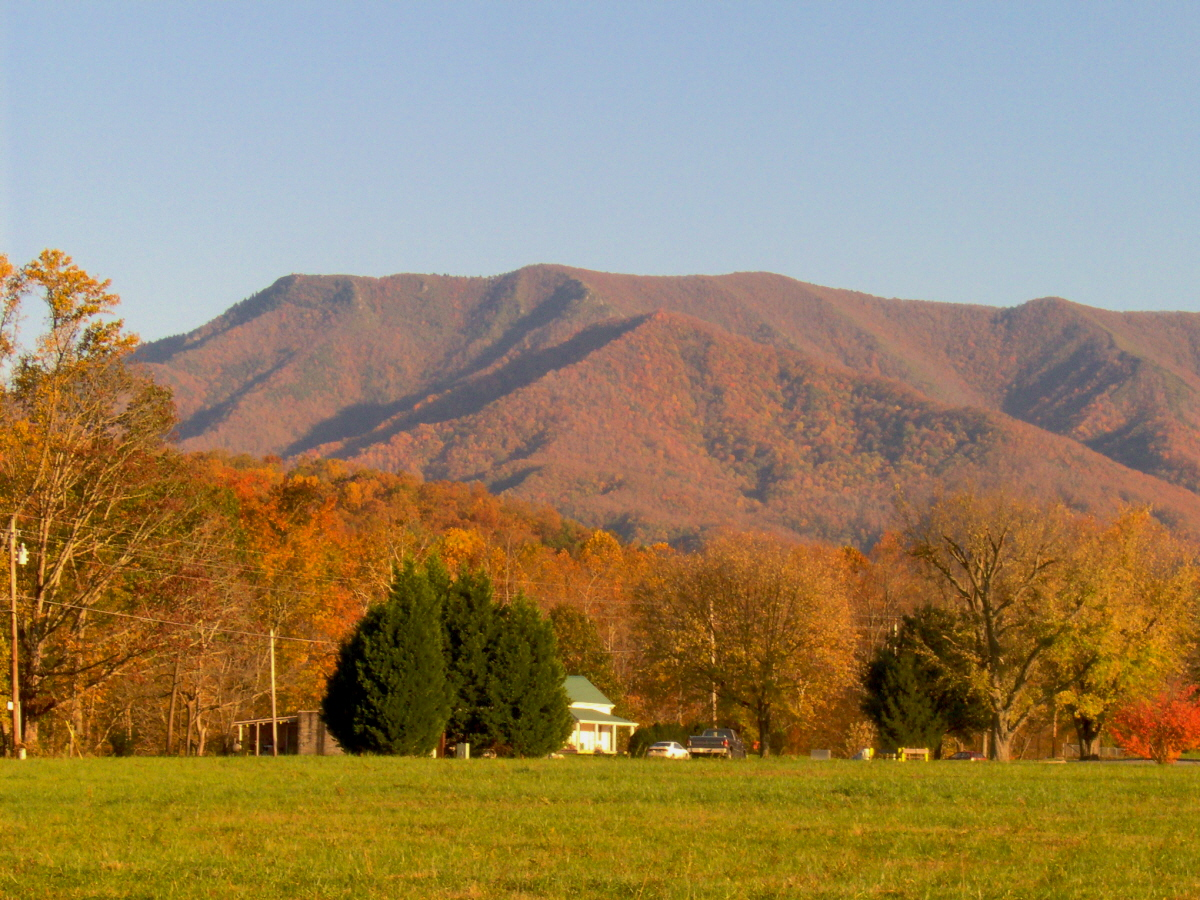
- Mt. Cammerer, looking south from Cosby, Tennessee

Highest point
- Elevation: 4,928 ft (1,502 m)
- Prominence: 8 ft (2.4 m)
- Coordinates: 35°45′49″N 83°09′40″W

Geography
- Location within the United States Location within North Carolina Location within Tennessee
- Location: Cocke County, Tennessee, U.S.; Haywood County, North Carolina, U.S.
- Parent range: Great Smoky Mountains
- Topo map: USGS Hartford

Climbing
- Easiest route: Low Gap Trail, Appalachian Trail and Mount Cammerer Trail

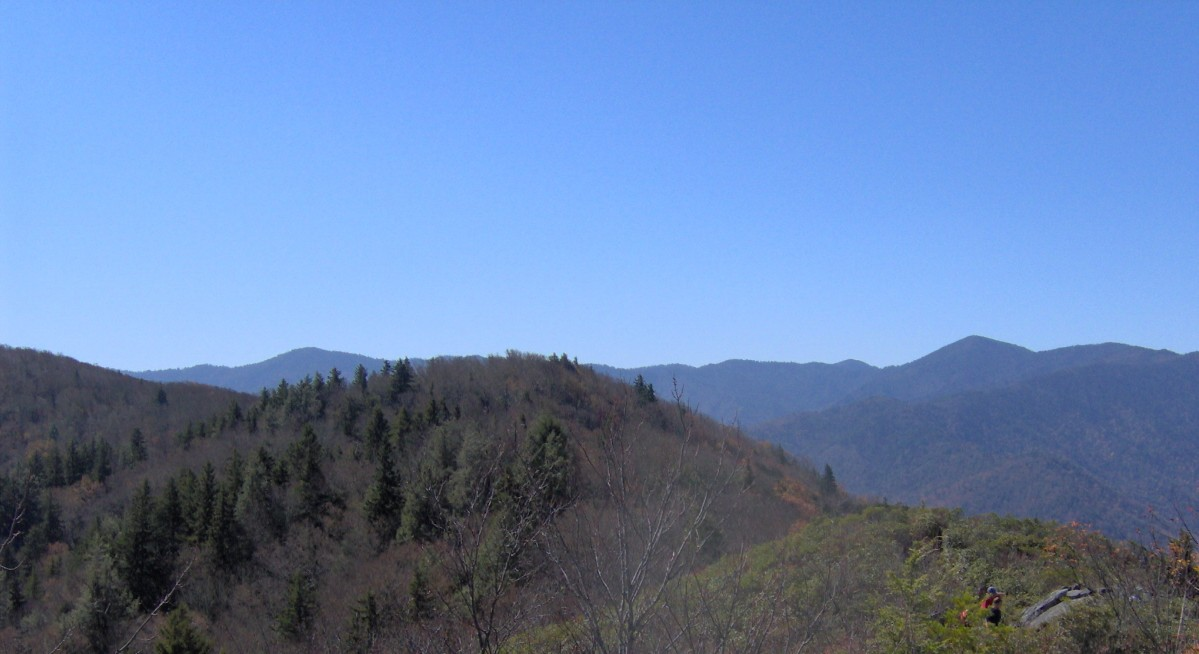
Looking southwest from Mt. Cammerer; the two peaks in the distance are Luftee Knob (left) and Mt. Guyot (right).

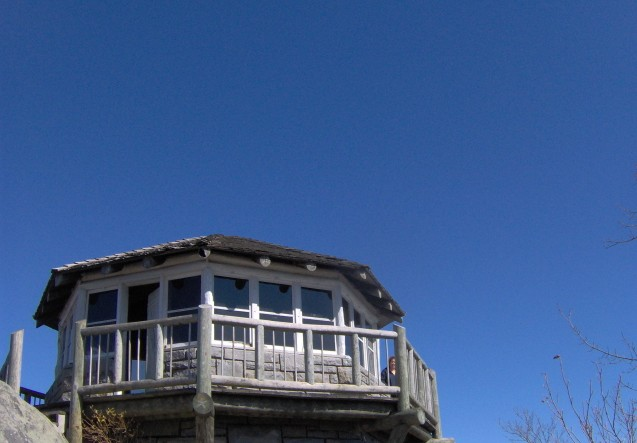
The lookout atop Mt. Cammerer

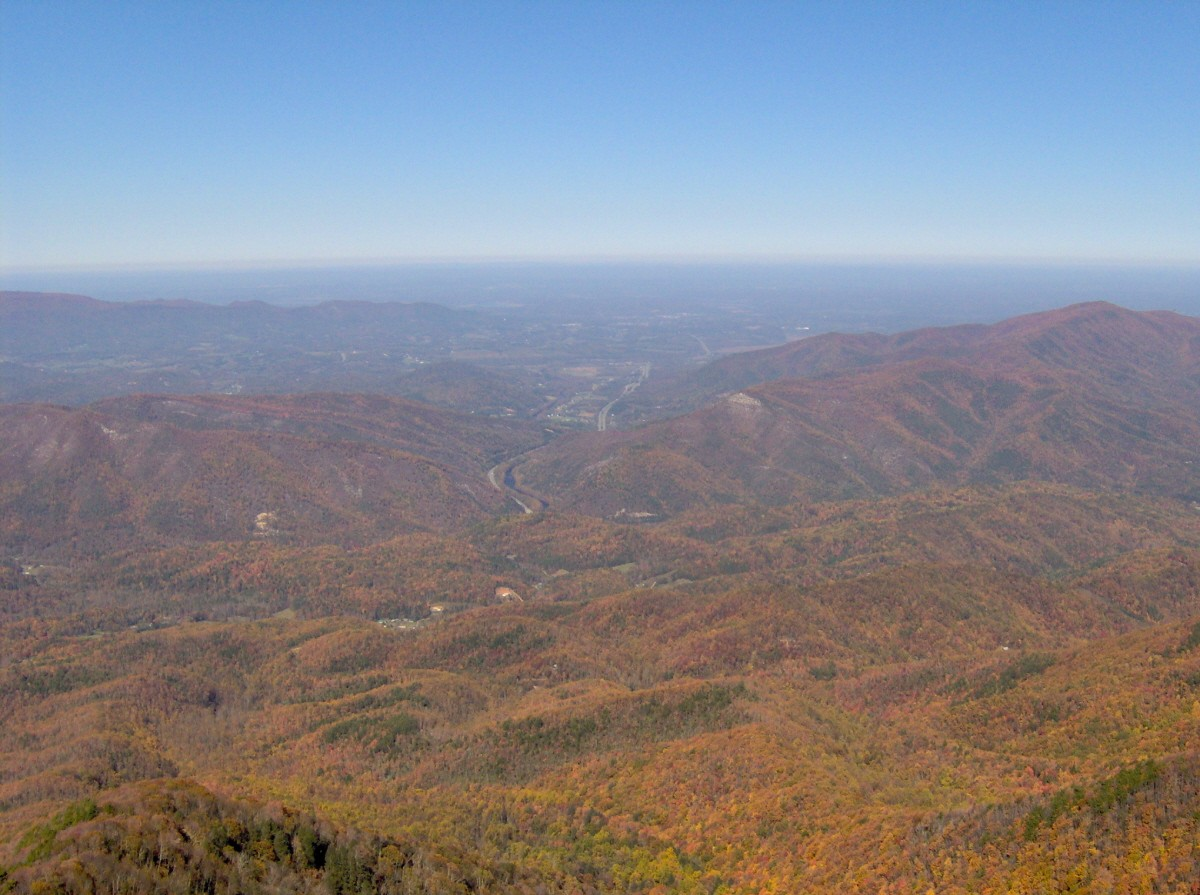
Looking north from the Mt. Cammerer lookout

Mount Cammerer is a mountain on the northeastern fringe of the Great Smoky Mountains, in the southeastern United States. The mountain is situated on the state line between Cocke County, Tennessee, and Haywood County, North Carolina. The Appalachian Trail traverses Cammerer's south slope, and a restored fire lookout at the summit offers panoramic views of the eastern Smokies, Cocke County, and the Blue Ridge Mountains.

Although a narrow ridge connects Mt. Cammerer to a nearby higher knob, leaving Cammerer with a very low topographic prominence, the mountain is clearly visible from the surrounding mountains as well as from various points in the town of Cosby and along I-40 as it crosses Cocke County. Mt. Cammerer is a popular hiking destination, especially in Autumn during peak fall foliage.

== Geology ==
Mt. Cammerer is composed of Thunderhead sandstone, a type of rock common throughout the Smokies. Thunderhead sandstone, part of the Ocoee Supergroup, was formed from Precambrian ocean sediments approximately one billion years ago. The Greenbrier Fault, which crosses the mountain's northern and eastern slopes, thrust the Thunderhead sandstone over the Rich Butt sandstone during the Paleozoic era. Approximately 200 million years ago, the North American and African plates collided in the Appalachian orogeny, thrusting the rock upward. One of Cammerer's key characteristics is the outcropping of contorted quartzite at the summit.

== History ==
Mount Cammerer was named for Arno B. Cammerer, director of the National Park Service (1933–1940) and an instrumental figure in establishing the Great Smoky Mountains National Park. Mt. Cammerer was previously known as "White Rock," referring to the quartzite outcrops at the summit. On some North Carolina maps, Mt. Cammerer is called "Sharptop". At least one story tells of a lightning strike that cut a hole in a rock at the summit, leaving a pool of water that attracted ravens.

Throughout the late-19th century and early 20th-century, moonshining was rampant in the area around Mt. Cammerer, as what was then a virgin wilderness provided the perfect cover for the illegal stills. Most residents in the area, however, were law-abiding mountain farmers, as described in local resident Mary Bell Smith's In the Shadow of the White Rock. Ella Costner, designated by the state of Tennessee as the "poet laureate of the Smokies," was born in the area of what is today the Cosby Campground, at the base of Mt. Cammerer.

In 1934, the Civilian Conservation Corps (CCC) built a camp at the base of the mountain and constructed most of the trails and overlooks in the area. The lookout at the summit of Mt. Cammerer was built by the CCC in 1937, using nearby rock and timber (other materials had to be hauled up the mountain). The tower was manned by a fire ranger until the 1960s, after which it fell into disrepair before being restored in 1996.

== Access ==
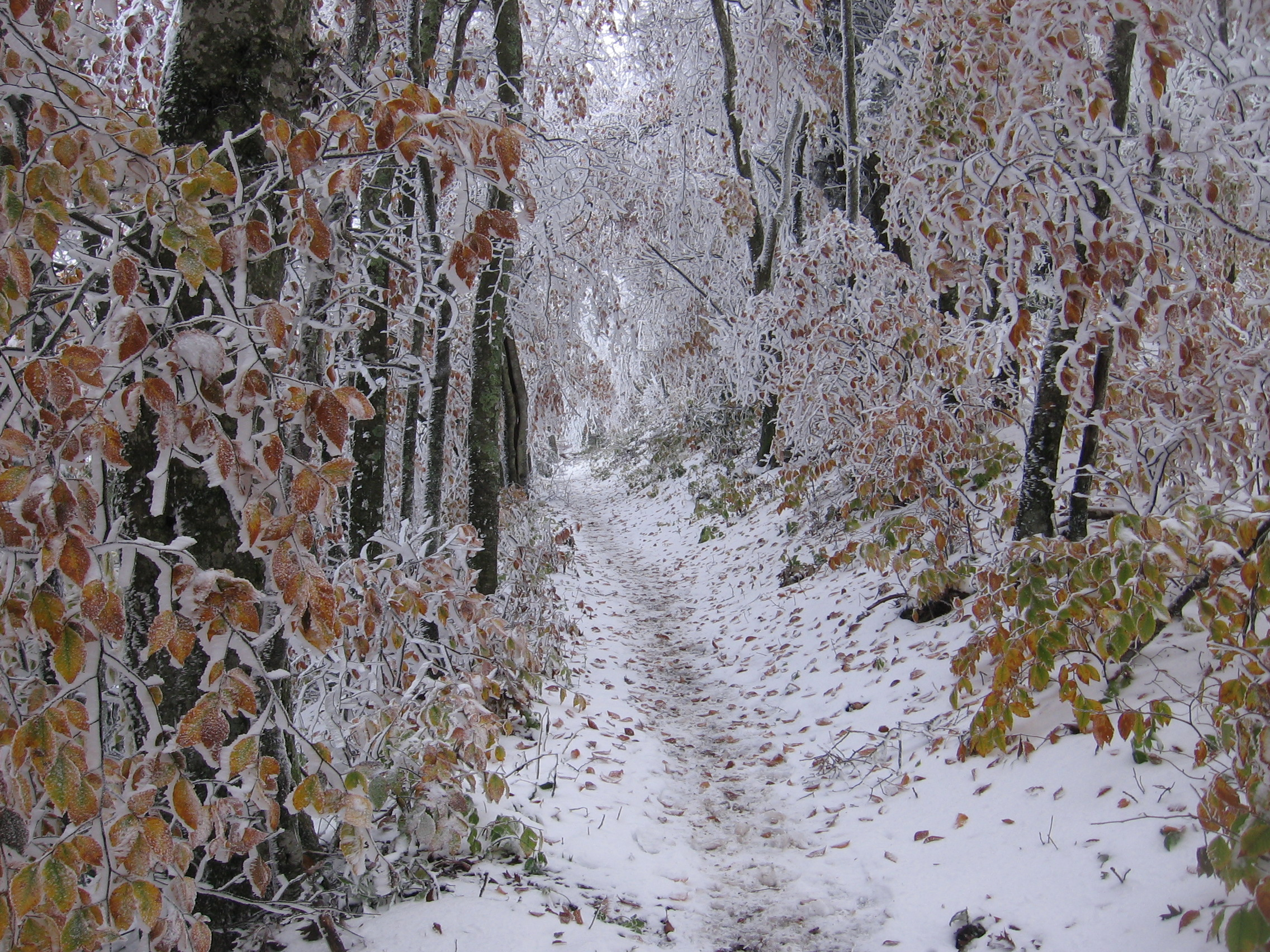
Mount Cammerer trail with heavily rimed trees.

The quickest route to the summit of Mt. Cammerer is to ascend the Low Gap Trail from the Cosby Campground to the Appalachian Trail at Low Gap. From Low Gap, it is just over two miles (3 km) to the Mt. Cammerer Trail, which follows the ridge a half-mile or so to the summit. The total distance from the Cosby Campground to the summit is just over five miles (8 km).

The Lower Mount Cammerer Trail follows the mountain's northern base over a seven-mile (11 km) trek before intersecting the Appalachian Trail near Davenport Gap. Most hikers who use this route make the following loop: Cosby Campground + Lower Mount Cammerer Trail + Appalachian Trail + Low Gap Trail + Cosby Campground. The Appalachian Trail intersects the Mount Cammerer tower trail along this route. The total distance for this loop, including the spur trail to the summit, is about 15 miles (24 km).

Multiple hiking trails, horse trails, and walkways intersect at the Cosby Campground, which can lead to confusion. From the parking lot (near the campground), one path leads east to the Lower Mount Cammerer Trail. To reach the Low Gap Trail, simply follow the path parallel to Cosby Creek. Both trails are marked.

A less-common loop follows the mountain's south slope from the Big Creek Campground (Exit 451 on I-40): Big Creek Trail + Low Gap Trail + Appalachian Trail + Chestnut Branch Trail. This loop is approximately 15 miles (24 km).
