= List of BarberMcMurry works =

Chronological list of buildings designed by the American architecture firm, BarberMcMurry (formerly Barber & McMurry). This list also includes early buildings designed by the firm's co-founder, Charles I. Barber.

== Key ==
Designed by Charles Barber (i.e., before the formation of Barber & McMurry, or outside the firm)
Designed by Charles Barber and Dean Parmelee

- NRHP – Listed on the National Register of Historic Places, with reference number given for individual listings, and historic district given for contributing properties
- R – An existing building remodeled by the firm, with year of remodeling given in "Completed" column

== Works ==
Completed Works table
Name	Location	Completed	Status	Other information	Image	Reference
C. Powell Smith House (Lyons View Pike)	Knoxville, Tennessee	1913	Demolished			
Southern States Building (Chilhowee Park)	Knoxville, Tennessee	1913	Demolished	Designed for the National Conservation Exposition		
First Christian Church (5th Ave.)	Knoxville, Tennessee	1914	Standing	NRHP contributing property (Emory Place Historic District)		
Cecil H. Baker House (Kingston Pike)	Knoxville, Tennessee	1916	Demolished			
Alexander Bonnyman House (Kingston Pike)	Knoxville, Tennessee	1916	Demolished	NRHP contributing property (Kingston Pike Historic District)		
J. Allen Smith House (Lyons View Pike)	Knoxville, Tennessee	1916	Demolished			
Rogan-Webb House (W. Main St.)	Rogersville, Tennessee	1920	Standing			
David Young House (1210 Oak Park Ave.)	Maryville, Tennessee	1920	Standing	Designed for David Franklin Young, Mayor of Maryville, 1919-1921 (Oak Park Historic District)		
S.D. Coykendall House (502 Scenic Dr.)	Knoxville, Tennessee	1921	Standing			
William Cary Ross House (Lyons View Pike)	Knoxville, Tennessee	1921	Demolished			
Candoro Marble Works showroom and garage	Knoxville, Tennessee	1921-1922	Standing	NRHP (#96001399)		
Fort Sanders Manor Apartments (Laurel Ave.)	Knoxville, Tennessee	1922	Standing			
Calvin Holmes House (Melrose Place)	Knoxville, Tennessee	1922	Standing			
Ridgeview II (Laurel Ave.)	Knoxville, Tennessee	1922				
Hugh VanDeventer House (Lyons Bend Rd.)	Knoxville, Tennessee	1923	Standing			
Benjamin McMurray House 937 Scenic Drive	Knoxville, Tennessee	1924	Standing	Benjamin Franklin McMurray's personal home		
Mountain View Hotel (R)	Gatlinburg, Tennessee	1924	Demolished	NRHP (#84003681); hotel built in 1916, overhauled in 1924		
West Barber House (518 Glenwood Ave.)	Knoxville, Tennessee	1925	Standing	NRHP contributing property (Old North Knoxville Historic District)		
J.V. Henderson House (Kingston Pike)	Knoxville, Tennessee	1925				
General Building (South Market St.)	Knoxville, Tennessee	1925	Standing	NRHP (#88000174)		
Knoxville YWCA Building (Clinch Ave.)	Knoxville, Tennessee	1925-1926	Standing			
Earl Worsham House (Kingston Pike)	Knoxville, Tennessee	1925	Standing			
A.A. Yeager House (Kingston Pike)	Knoxville, Tennessee	1925	Standing			
Barton Chapel	Robbins, Tennessee	1926	Standing	NRHP (#84003679)		
Glen Craig (Westland Drive)	Knoxville, Tennessee	1926	Standing			
C.M. Moore House (Cherokee Blvd.)	Knoxville, Tennessee	1926	Standing			
E.H. Scharringhaus House (Kingston Pike)	Knoxville, Tennessee	1926	Standing			
Washington Pike Methodist Church	Knoxville, Tennessee	1926	Standing			
George F. Barber Jr. House (1854 Prospect Pl.)	Knoxville, Tennessee	1927	Standing	Designed for Charles Barber's brother George.		
Holston Hills Country Club	Knoxville, Tennessee	1927	Standing			
Chase and Laura Barber Hutchinson House (1856 Prospect Pl.)	Knoxville, Tennessee	1927 (approx.)	Standing	Designed for Charles Barber's sister Laura.		
Warren Kerr House (Cherokee Blvd.)	Knoxville, Tennessee	1927	Standing			
William Seale Jr. House (Kingston Pike)	Knoxville, Tennessee	1927	Standing	Currently home to the Knoxville Montessori School		
J.B. Coykendall House (Lyons View Pike)	Knoxville, Tennessee	1928	Standing			
Hugh M. Goforth House (Lyons View Pike)	Knoxville, Tennessee	1928	Demolished			
Westcliff (Lyons View Pike)	Knoxville, Tennessee	1928	Demolished	Built for inventor Weston Fulton		
Alumni Gym Auditorium (University of Tennessee)	Knoxville, Tennessee	1929	Standing	Renovated by BarberMcMurry in 2003		
First Christian Church, Education Wing (Fifth Ave.)	Knoxville, Tennessee	1929	Standing			
Knoxville YMCA Building (Locust St.)	Knoxville, Tennessee	1929-1930	Standing	NRHP (#83004256)		
N.E. Logan House (Lyons View Pike)	Knoxville, Tennessee	1929	Standing			
Sequoyah School (Southgate Rd.)	Knoxville, Tennessee	1929	Standing			
George Taylor House (Kingston Pike) (R)	Knoxville, Tennessee	1929	Standing	NRHP (Kingston Pike Historic District); house built in 1900, remodeled in 1929		
1029 Scenic Drive	Knoxville, Tennessee	1930	Standing			
Martin Baker House (Lyons View Pike)	Knoxville, Tennessee	1930	Demolished			
Henson Hall (University of Tennessee)	Knoxville, Tennessee	1930	Standing			
Hesler Hall (University of Tennessee)	Knoxville, Tennessee	1930	Standing			
Church Street United Methodist Church (Henley St.)	Knoxville, Tennessee	1931	Standing	NRHP (#09000115); co-designed with John Russell Pope		
Hoskins Library (University of Tennessee)	Knoxville, Tennessee	1931-1932	Standing			
Hal B. Mebane Jr. House	Knoxville, Tennessee	1931	Standing			
Charles I. Barber House (Alcoa Highway)	Knoxville, Tennessee	1933	Standing			
Ossoli Circle Clubhouse	Knoxville, Tennessee	1933	Standing	NRHP (#85000620)		
Smoky Mountain Hiking Club Cabin	Sevier County, Tennessee	1934	Standing	Barber was a member of this club; cabin assembled from logs of a dismantled pioneer cabin		
Dabney Hall (University of Tennessee)	Knoxville, Tennessee	1935	Standing			
Fred Austin House (Lyons View Pike)	Knoxville, Tennessee	1936	Standing			
South High School	Knoxville, Tennessee	1936	Standing	High school closed in 1976		
Riverdale School	Knox County, Tennessee	1938	Standing	NRHP (#94001258)		
Christenberry Club Room (Henegar Ave.)	Knoxville, Tennessee	1939	Standing	NRHP (#97000242)		
Arrowcraft Shop (Arrowmont)	Gatlinburg, Tennessee	1940	Moved	NRHP contributing property (Settlement School Community Outreach Historic District)		
Great Smoky Mountains National Park Headquarters	Sevier County, Tennessee	1940	Standing			
Stuart Dormitory (Arrowmont)	Gatlinburg, Tennessee	1941	Standing	NRHP contributing property (Settlement School Dormitories and Dwellings Historic District)		
Graham County Courthouse	Robbinsville, North Carolina	1942	Standing	NRHP (#07000883)		
Melrose Hall (University of Tennessee)	Knoxville, Tennessee	1946	Standing			
904 Southgate Drive	Knoxville, Tennessee	1947	Standing			
Nicol Health Clinic Building (Arrowmont)	Gatlinburg, Tennessee	1948	Demolished	NRHP contributing property (Settlement School Community Outreach Historic District)		
First United Methodist Church	Gatlinburg, Tennessee	1950	Standing	NRHP (#07000661; listed as First Methodist Church, Gatlinburg)		
Smith Staff House (Arrowmont)	Gatlinburg, Tennessee	1952	Standing	NRHP contributing property (Settlement School Dormitories and Dwellings Historic District)		
Carolyn P. Brown University Center (University of Tennessee)	Knoxville, Tennessee	1955	Standing			
Jenkins House (Cherokee Blvd.)	Knoxville, Tennessee	1955	Standing	Designed by Benjamin McMurry Jr.		
Fort Sanders Regional Medical Center	Knoxville, Tennessee	1958	Standing			
Red Barn (Arrowmont) (R)	Gatlinburg, Tennessee	1959	Standing	NRHP contributing property (Settlement School Dormitories and Dwellings Historic District); built in 1923 as a stock barn; remodeled in 1959 as a dormitory		
Fountain City Library	Knoxville, Tennessee	1964	Standing			
Rokeby Condominiums	Nashville, Tennessee	1976	Standing			
John J. Duncan Federal Building	Knoxville, Tennessee	1988	Standing			
Thompson Cancer Survival Center (Fort Sanders)	Knoxville, Tennessee	1988	Standing			
Roswell Presbyterian Church	Roswell, Georgia	1999	Standing			
Cheyenne Ambulatory Medical Center	Oak Ridge, Tennessee	2000	Standing			
Smokies Park	Kodak, Tennessee	2000	Standing			
East Tennessee History Center (Gay St.)	Knoxville, Tennessee	2004	Standing			
Niswonger Performing Arts Center	Greeneville, Tennessee	2004	Standing			
Mercy Medical Center North	Knoxville, Tennessee	2007	Standing			
Pratt Pavilion (University of Tennessee)	Knoxville, Tennessee	2007	Standing			
Clayton Science Center (Webb School)	Knoxville, Tennessee	2008	Standing			
Ted Russell Hall (Carson Newman College)	Jefferson City, Tennessee	2008	Standing			
Magnolia Campus (Pellissippi State Community College)	Knoxville, Tennessee	2009	Standing			
Heart Hospital (University of Tennessee Medical Center)	Knoxville, Tennessee	2010	Standing			
King Family Library	Sevierville, Tennessee	2010	Standing			
LeConte Medical Center	Sevierville, Tennessee	2010	Standing			
Cathedral of the Most Sacred Heart of Jesus	Knoxville, Tennessee	2018	Standing			

== See also ==
- List of George Franklin Barber works
