= Gatlinburg, Tennessee =

City in Tennessee, United States

Gatlinburg
- City
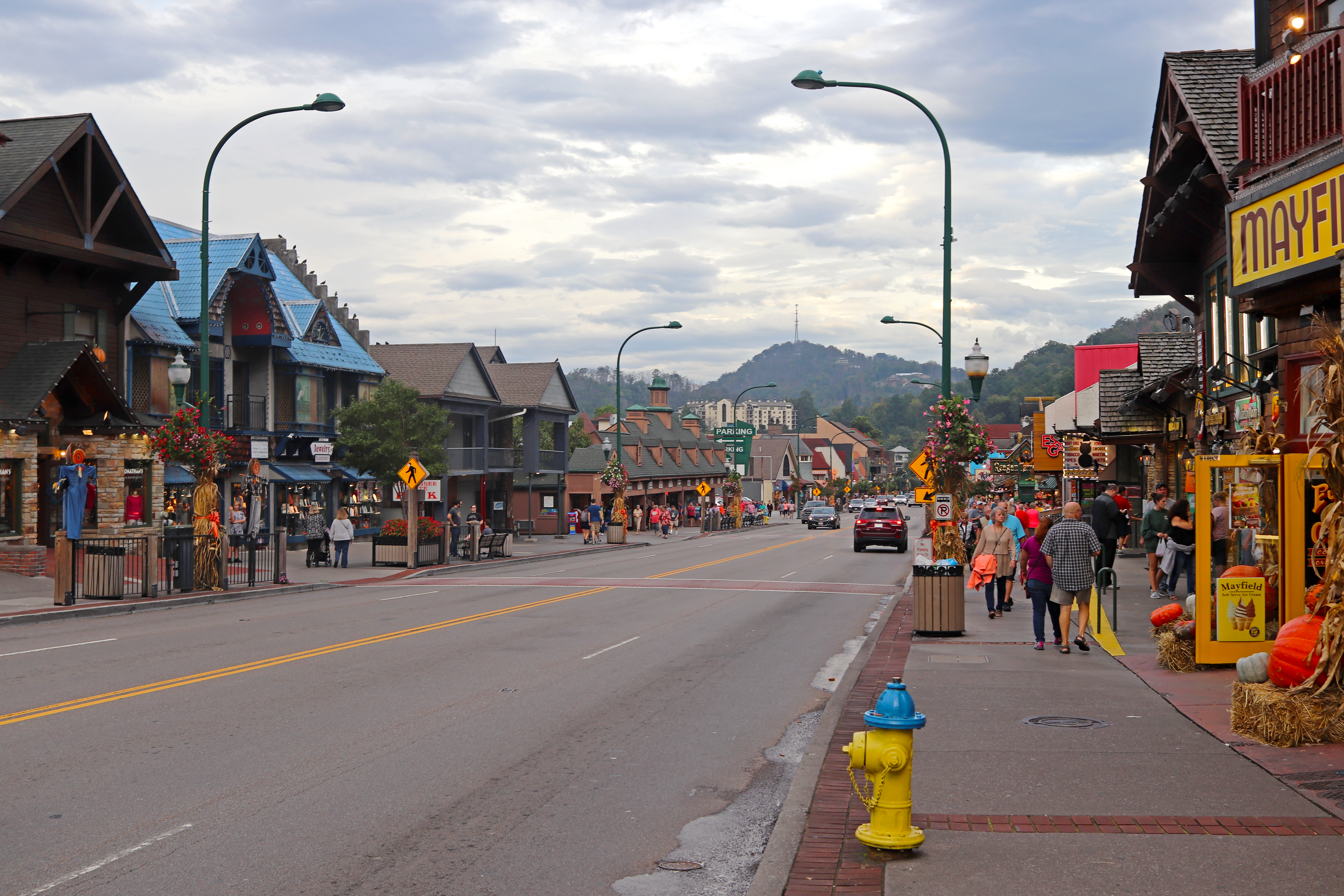
- US 441 in downtown Gatlinburg c. 2018

- Flag Logo
- Nickname: "Gateway to the Great Smoky Mountains"
- Location of Gatlinburg in Sevier County, Tennessee

- Location within Tennessee Location within the United States
- Coordinates: 35°42′52″N 83°31′29″W
- Country: United States
- State: Tennessee
- County: Sevier
- Settled: c. 1806
- Incorporated: 1945
- Named for: Radford Gatlin

Government
  - Type: City Manager-Commission
  - Mayor: Mike Werner

Area
  - Total: 10.41 sq mi (26.97 km^{2})
  - Land: 10.41 sq mi (26.97 km^{2})
  - Water: 0 sq mi (0.00 km^{2}) 0%
- Elevation: 1,450 ft (440 m)

Population (2020)
  - Total: 3,577
  - Estimate (2024): 3,703 ▲
  - Density: 343.5/sq mi (132.61/km^{2})
- Time zone: UTC−5 (EST)
  - Summer (DST): UTC−4 (EDT)
- ZIP code: 37738
- Area code: 865
- FIPS code: 47-28800
- GNIS feature ID: 2403685
- Website: gatlinburgtn.gov

Gatlinburg is a city in Sevier County, Tennessee, United States. It is located 39 miles (63 km) southeast of Knoxville and had a population of 3,577 at the 2020 census. It is a popular mountain resort town, as it rests on the border of Great Smoky Mountains National Park along U.S. Route 441.

== History ==
=== Early history ===
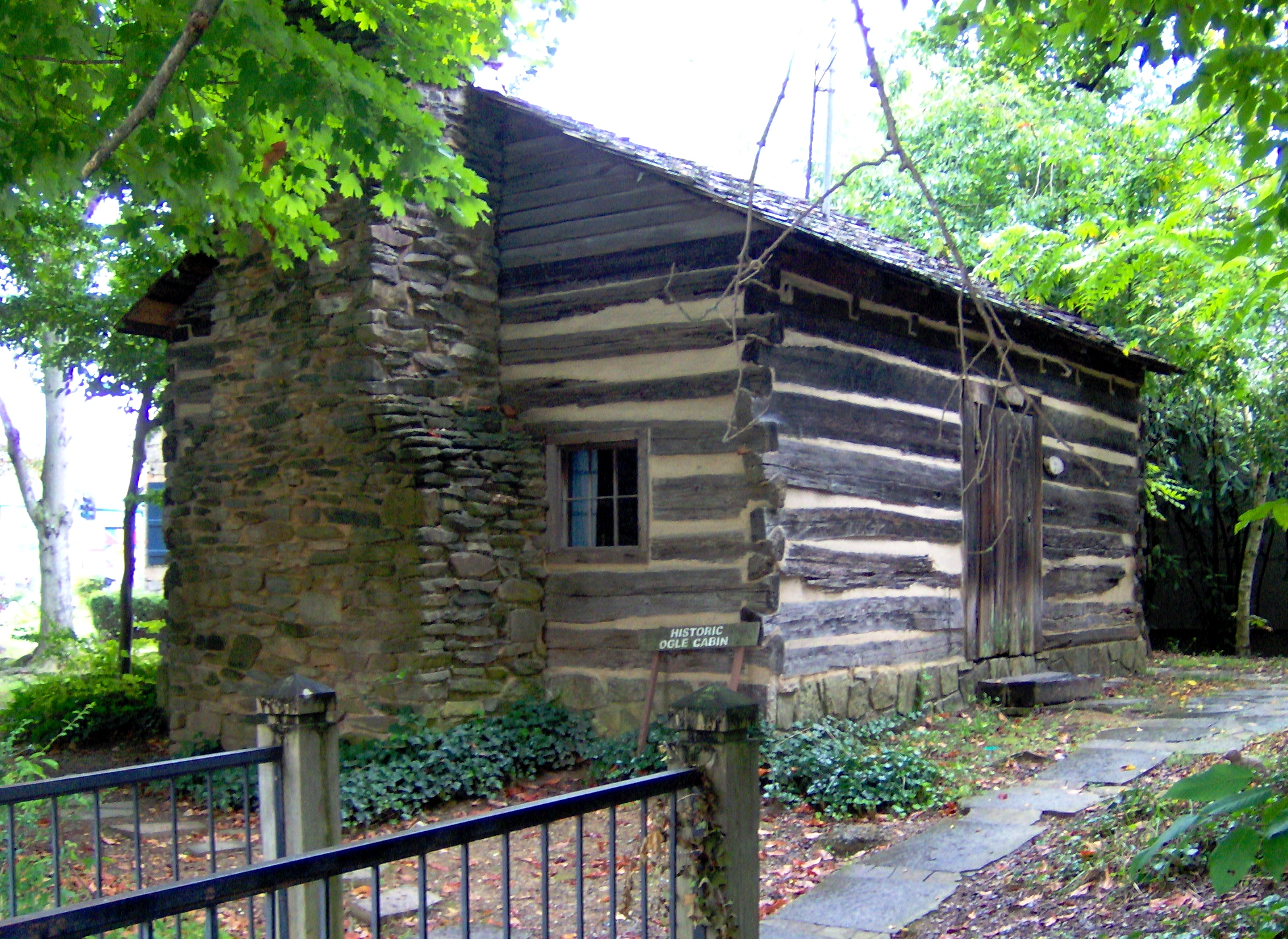
The William "Old Billy" and Martha Jane Huskey Ogle Cabin in Gatlinburg

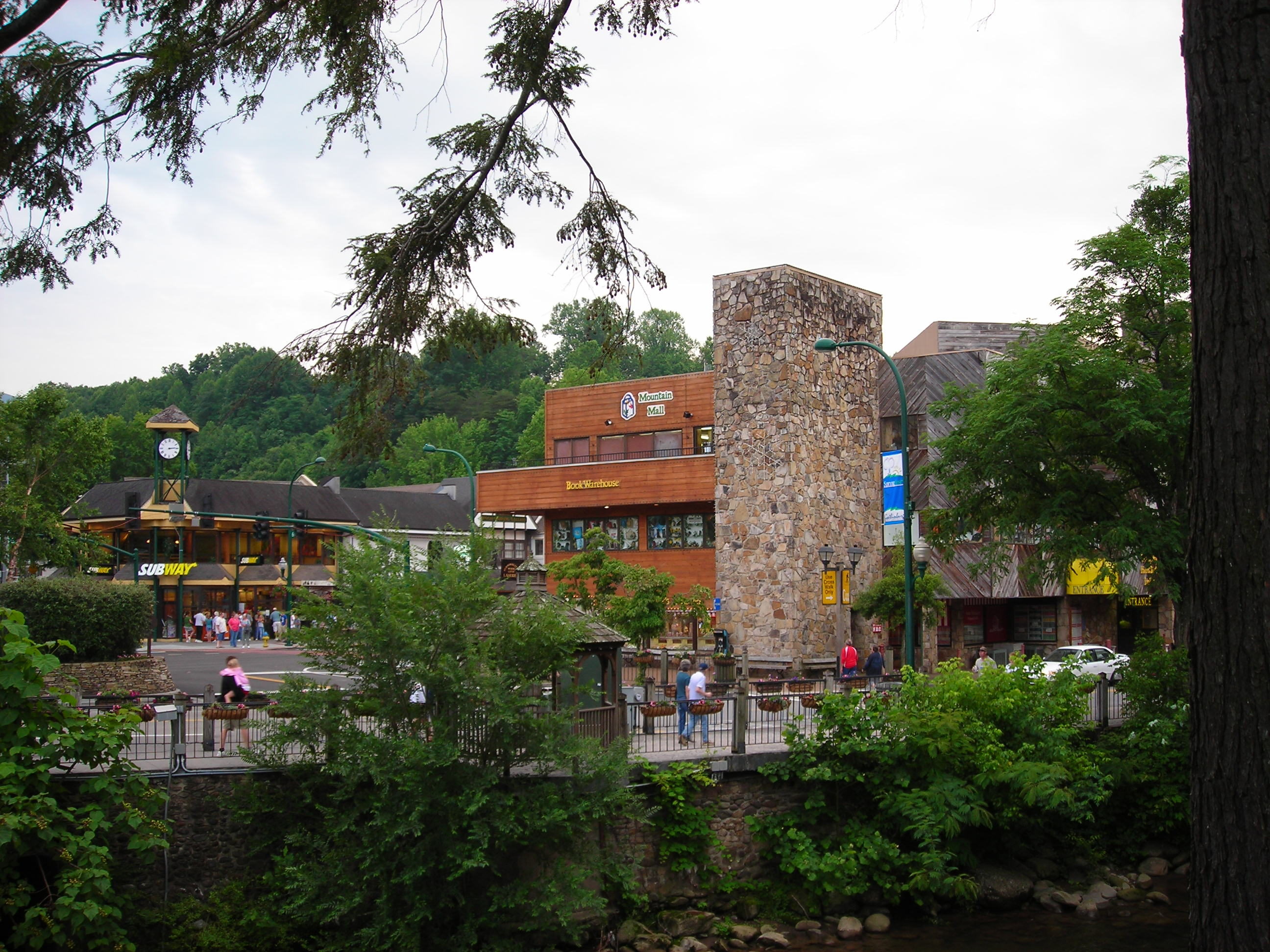
Downtown Gatlinburg

For centuries, Cherokee hunters, as well as other Native American hunters before them, used a footpath known as the Indian Gap Trail to access the abundant game in the forests and coves of the Smokies. This trail connected the Great Indian Warpath with Rutherford Indian Trace, following the West Fork of the Little Pigeon River from modern-day Sevierville through modern-day Pigeon Forge, Gatlinburg, and the Sugarlands, crossing the crest of the Smokies along the slopes of Mount Collins, and descending into North Carolina along the banks of the Oconaluftee River. US-441 largely follows this same route today, although it crests at Newfound Gap rather than Indian Gap.

Although various 18th-century European and early American hunters and fur trappers probably traversed or camped in the flats where Gatlinburg is now situated, it was Edgefield, South Carolina, native William Ogle (1751–1803) who first decided to permanently settle in the area. With the help of the Cherokee, Ogle cut, hewed, and notched logs in the flats, planning to erect a cabin the following year. He returned home to Edgefield to retrieve his family and grow one final crop for supplies. However, shortly after his arrival in Edgefield, a malaria epidemic swept the low country; Ogle succumbed to the disease in 1803.

His widow, Martha Huskey Ogle (1756–1827), moved the family to Virginia, where she had relatives. Sometime around 1806, Martha Huskey Ogle made the journey over Indian Gap Trail to what is now Gatlinburg with her brother, Peter Huskey, her daughter, Rebecca, and her daughter's husband, James McCarter. William Ogle's notched logs awaited them, and they erected a cabin near the confluence of Baskins Creek and the West Fork of the Little Pigeon shortly after their arrival. The cabin still stands today near the heart of Gatlinburg. James and Rebecca McCarter settled in the Cartertown district of Gatlinburg.

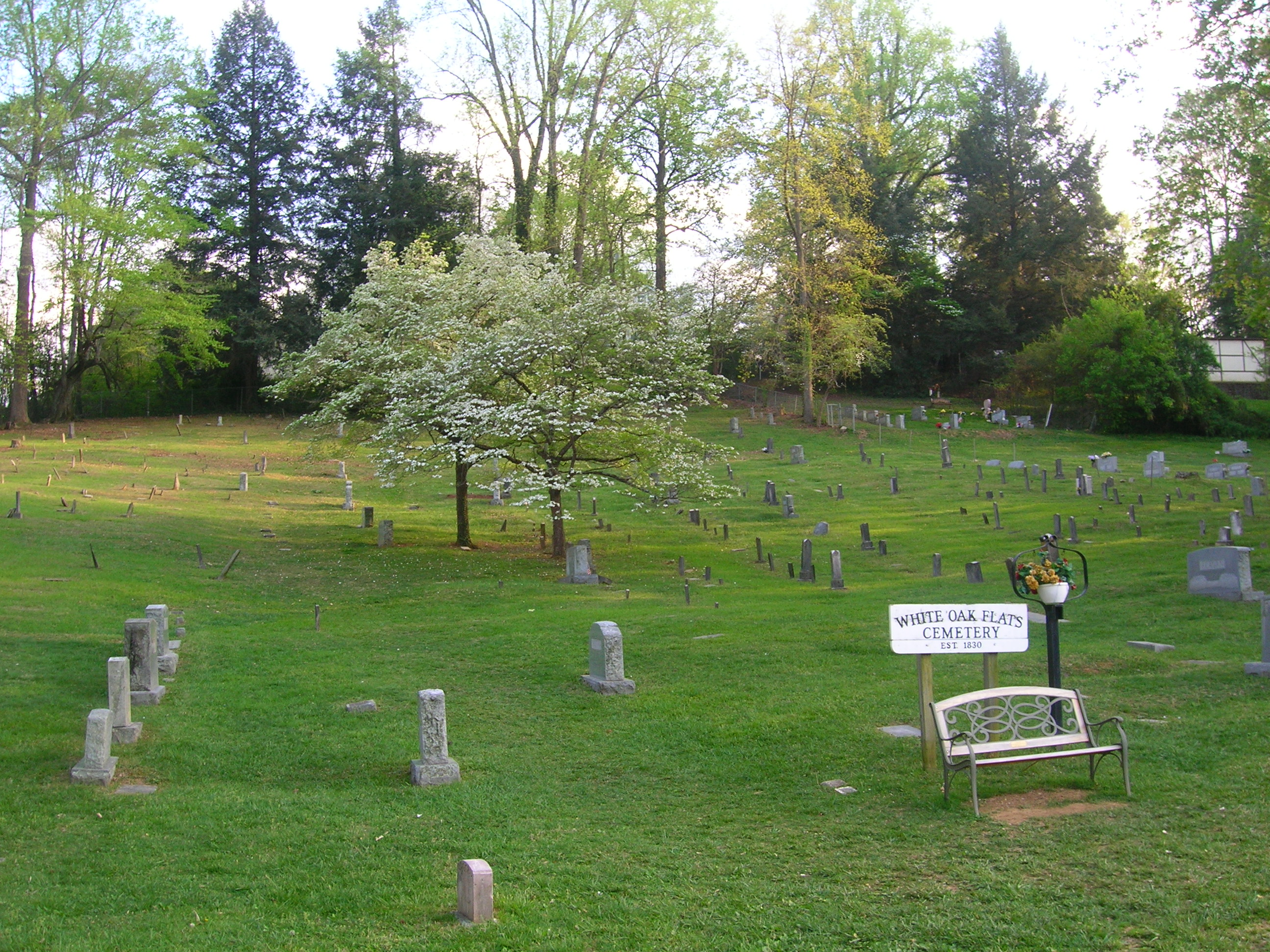
White Oak Flats Cemetery

In the decade following the arrival of the Ogles, McCarters, and Huskeys in what came to be known as White Oak Flats, a steady stream of settlers moved into the area. Most were veterans of the American Revolution or War of 1812 who had converted the 50-acre (200,000 m^{2}) tracts they had received for service in war into deeds. Among these early settlers were Timothy Reagan (c. 1750–1830), John Ownby Jr. (1791–1857), and Henry Bohanon (1760–1842). Their descendants still live in the area today.

=== Radford Gatlin and the Civil War ===
In 1856, a post office was established in the general store of Radford Gatlin (c. 1798–1880), giving the town the name Gatlinburg. Even though the town bore his name, Gatlin, who didn't arrive in the flats until around 1854, constantly bickered with his neighbors. By 1857, a full-blown feud had erupted between the Gatlins and the Ogles, probably over Gatlin's attempts to divert the town's main road. The eve of the U.S. Civil War found Gatlin, who became a Confederate sympathizer, at odds with the residents of the flats, who were mostly pro-Union, and he was forced out in 1859.

Despite its anti-slavery sentiments, Gatlinburg, like most Smoky communities, tried to remain neutral during the war. This changed when a company of Confederate Colonel William Holland Thomas' Legion occupied the town to protect the saltpeter mines at Alum Cave, near the Tennessee-North Carolina border. Federal forces marched south from Knoxville and Sevierville to drive out Thomas' men, who had built a small fort on Burg Hill. Lucinda Oakley Ogle, whose grandfather witnessed the ensuing skirmish, later recounted her grandfather's recollections:

... he told me about when he was a sixteen-year-old boy during the Civil War and would hide under a big cliff on Turkey Nest Ridge and watch the Blue Coats ride their horses around the graveyard hill, shooting their cannon toward Burg Hill where the Grey Coats had a fort and would ride their horses around the Burg Hill ...

As the Union forces converged on the town, the outnumbered Confederates were forced to retreat across the Smokies to North Carolina. Confederate forces did not return, although sporadic small raids continued until the end of the war.

=== Early 20th century ===
In the 1880s, the invention of the bandsaw and the logging railroad led to a boom in the lumber industry. As forests throughout the Southeastern United States were harvested, lumber companies pushed deeper into the mountain areas of the Appalachian highlands. In 1901, Colonel W.B. Townsend established the Little River Lumber Company in Tuckaleechee Cove to the west, and lumber interests began buying up logging rights to vast tracts of forest in the Smokies.

Andrew Jackson Huff (1878–1949), originally of Greene County, was a pivotal figure in Gatlinburg at this time. Huff erected a sawmill in Gatlinburg in 1900, and local residents began supplementing their income by providing lodging to loggers and other lumber company officials. Tourists also began to trickle into the area, drawn to the Smokies by the writings of authors such as Mary Noailles Murfree and Horace Kephart, who wrote extensively about the region's natural wonders.

In 1912, the Pi Beta Phi women's fraternity established a settlement school (now Arrowmont School of Arts and Crafts) in Gatlinburg after a survey of the region found the town to be most in need of educational facilities in the area. Although skeptical locals were initially worried that the fraternity might be religious propagandists or opportunists, the school's enrollment grew from 33 to 134 in its first year of operation. Along with providing basic education to children in the area, the school's staff created a small market for local crafts.

Isolation in the region attracted folklorists such as Cecil Sharp of London to the area in the years following World War I. Sharp's collection of Appalachian ballads was published in 1932.

=== National park ===
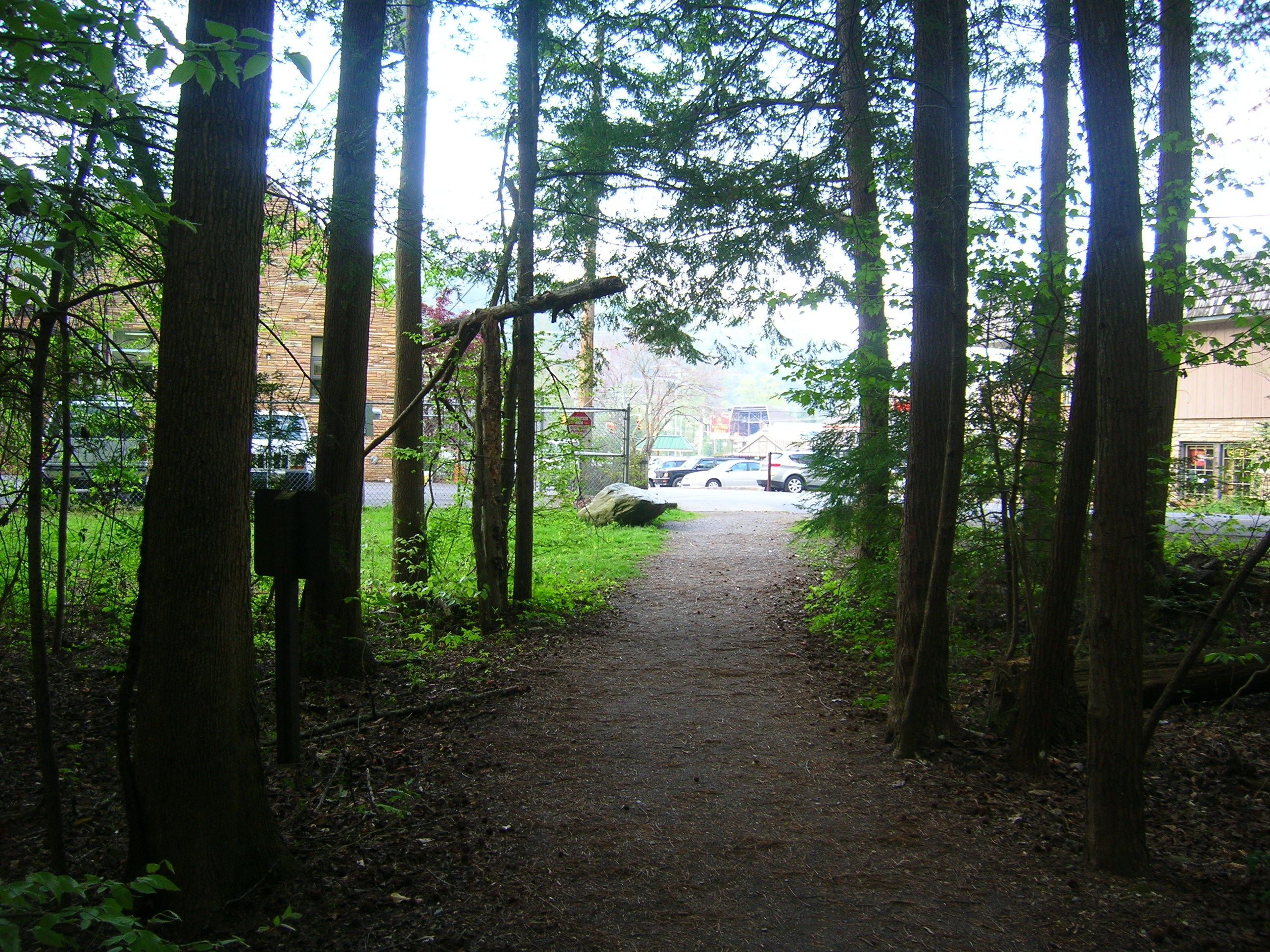
Gatlinburg Trail entering Gatlinburg from the Great Smoky Mountains National Park

Extensive logging in the early 1900s led to increased calls by conservationists for federal action, and in 1911, Congress passed the Weeks Act to allow for the purchase of land for national forests. Authors such as Horace Kephart and Knoxville-area businesses began advocating for the creation of a national park in the Smokies that would be similar to Yellowstone or Yosemite in the Western United States. With the purchase of 76,000 acres (310 km^{2}) in the Little River Lumber Company tract in 1926, the movement quickly became a reality.

Andrew Huff spearheaded the movement in the Gatlinburg area, and he opened the first hotel in Gatlinburg – the Mountain View Hotel – in 1916. His son, Jack, established LeConte Lodge atop Mount Le Conte in 1926. Despite resistance from lumberers at Elkmont and difficulties with the Tennessee legislature, Great Smoky Mountains National Park opened in 1934.

The park radically changed Gatlinburg. When the Pi Beta Phis arrived in 1912, Gatlinburg was a small hamlet with six houses, a blacksmith shop, a general store, a Baptist church, and a greater community of 600 individuals, most of whom lived in log cabins. In 1934, the first year the park was open, an estimated 40,000 visitors passed through the city. Within a year, this number had increased over twelvefold to 500,000. From 1940 to 1950, the cost per acre of land in Gatlinburg increased from $50 (equivalent to $1,000 in 2025) to $8,000 (equivalent to $107,000 in 2025).

While the park's arrival benefited Gatlinburg and made many of the town's residents wealthy, the tourism explosion led to problems with air quality and urban sprawl. Even in modern times, the town's infrastructure is often pushed to the limit on peak vacation days and must consistently adapt to accommodate the growing number of tourists.

=== Fire of 1992 ===
On the night of July 14, 1992, Gatlinburg gained national attention when an entire city block burned to the ground due to faulty wiring in a light fixture. The Ripley's Believe It or Not! museum was consumed by the fire, along with an arcade, haunted house, and souvenir shop. The blaze was stopped before it could consume the adjacent 32-story Gatlinburg Space Needle. Known to locals as "Rebel Corner," the block was completely rebuilt and reopened to visitors in 1995. Few artifacts from the Ripley's Museum were salvaged, and those that survived are marked with that designation in the new museum. The fire prompted new downtown building codes and a new downtown fire station. Ripley's has caught fire twice since it reopened, once in 2000 and again in 2003. Both of those fires, coincidentally, were caused by faulty light fixtures. The 2000 fire caused no damage, and the 2003 fire was contained to the building's exterior, with the museum suffering minimal damage, primarily cosmetic.

=== Fire of 2016 ===
Starting in the Great Smoky Mountains National Park at Chimney Tops in November 2016, a moderately contained wildfire was compounded by very strong winds – with gusts recorded up to 87 miles per hour (140 km/h) – and extremely dry conditions due to drought, causing it to spread down into Gatlinburg, Pigeon Forge, Pittman Center, and other nearby areas. It forced mass evacuations, and Governor Bill Haslam ordered the National Guard to the area. The center of Gatlinburg's tourist district escaped heavy damage, but the surrounding wooded region was called "the apocalypse" by a fire department lieutenant. Approximately 14,000 people were evacuated that evening, more than 2,400 structures were damaged or destroyed, and damages totaled more than $500 million. Fourteen people died in the fires, including local citizens and visiting tourists.

Following the fires, the town of Gatlinburg was shut down and considered a crime scene. The city reopened to residents only after a few days but maintained a strict curfew for more than a week, only reopening to the public after the curfew was lifted. In June 2017, the Sevier County district attorney dropped charges against two juveniles accused of starting the fire due to an inability to prove their actions led to the devastation that occurred in Gatlinburg five days later.

In May 2018, two Gatlinburg residents filed a $14.8 million lawsuit against the federal government for personal losses suffered in the fire.

=== Registered historic sites ===
- First Methodist Church, Gatlinburg: Designed by Charles I. Barber in Late Gothic Revival style.
- Settlement School Community Outreach Historic District: Pi Beta Phi established a settlement school in the area in 1912. This part of the designated historic district includes the Jennie Nicol Health Clinic Building, the Arrowcraft Shop, the Ogle Cabin, Cottage at the Creek, and Craftsman's Fair Grounds and School Playground. The Settlement School Dormitories and Dwellings Historic District consists of Helmick House (Teacher's Cottage), Stuart Dormitory, Ruth Barrett Smith Staff House, Old Wood Studio, a chicken coop, and a stock barn.

== Geography ==
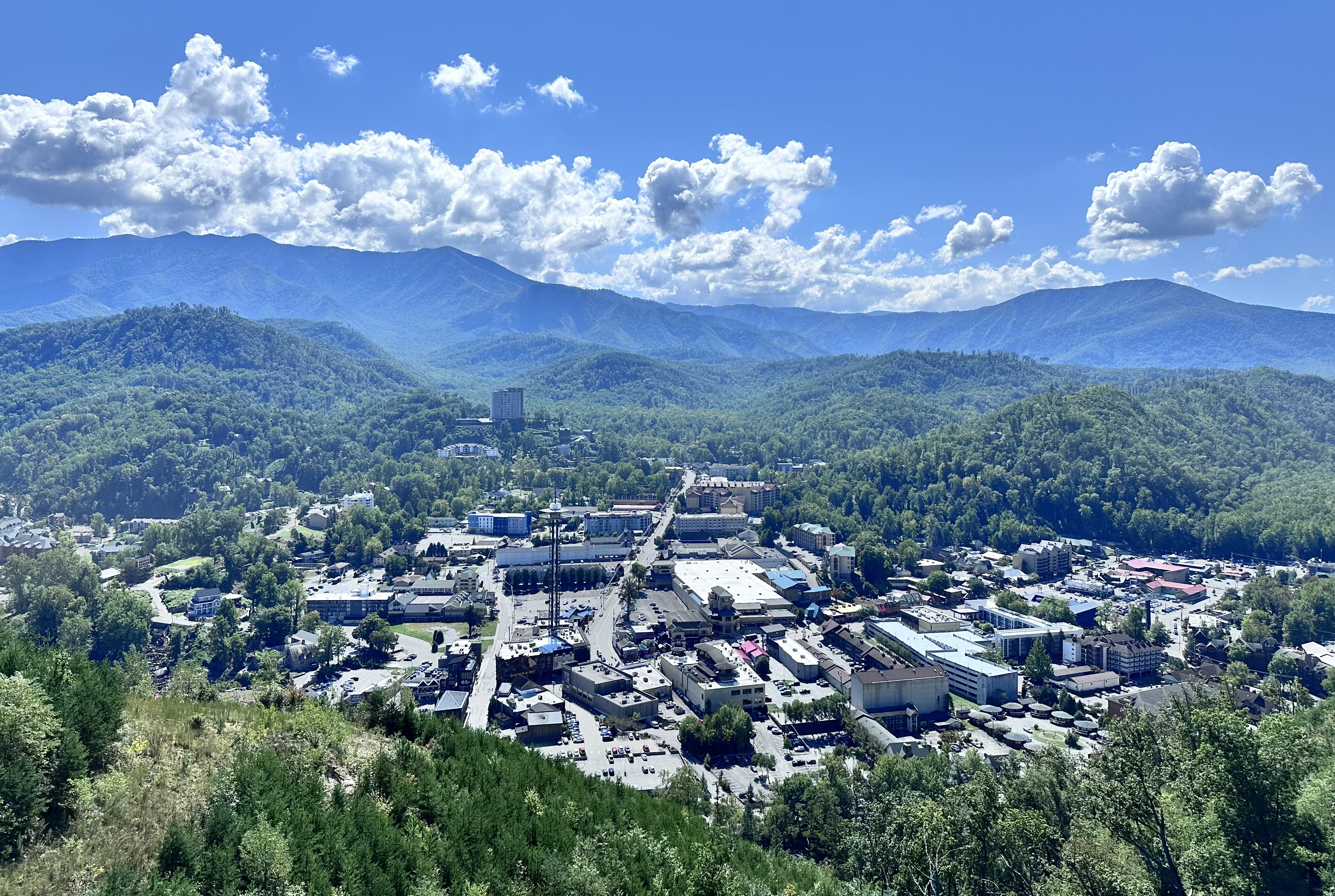
Gatlinburg viewed from the Gatlinburg SkyPark

According to the United States Census Bureau, the city has a total area of 10.1 square miles (26 km^{2}), all of which is land. It is surrounded on all sides by high ridges, with the Le Conte and Sugarland Mountain massifs rising to the south, Cove Mountain to the west, Big Ridge to the northeast, and Grapeyard Ridge to the east. The main watershed is the West Fork of the Little Pigeon River, which flows from its source on the slopes of Mount Collins to its junction with the Little Pigeon at Sevierville.

U.S. Route 441 is the main traffic artery in Gatlinburg, running through the center of town from north to south. Farther along 441, Pigeon Forge is approximately 6 miles (9.7 km) to the north, and Great Smoky Mountains National Park (viz. the Sugarlands) is approximately 2 miles (3.2 km) to the south. TN-73 (Little River Road) forks off from 441 in the Sugarlands and heads west for roughly 25 miles (40 km), connecting the Gatlinburg area with Townsend and Blount County. U.S. Route 321 enters Gatlinburg from Pigeon Forge and Wears Valley to the north before turning east and connecting the city to Newport and Cosby.

=== Climate ===
Gatlinburg has a humid subtropical climate (Koppen: Cfa) with hot, humid summers and cool, wet winters. Precipitation is heavy year round, peaking in the months of May–July, with October being the driest month, with only 3.19 inches (81 mm) of average precipitation. Snowfall is lower in the valley, averaging about 8 inches (20 cm) of annual snowfall.

Climate data for Gatlinburg, Tennessee, 1991–2020 normals, extremes 1921–present
Month	Jan	Feb	Mar	Apr	May	Jun	Jul	Aug	Sep	Oct	Nov	Dec	Year
Record high °F (°C)	81 (27)	85 (29)	86 (30)	93 (34)	98 (37)	106 (41)	105 (41)	100 (38)	102 (39)	94 (34)	85 (29)	80 (27)	106 (41)
Mean maximum °F (°C)	68.9 (20.5)	71.8 (22.1)	79.0 (26.1)	85.6 (29.8)	86.6 (30.3)	89.5 (31.9)	90.8 (32.7)	90.0 (32.2)	88.0 (31.1)	82.0 (27.8)	75.8 (24.3)	69.7 (20.9)	92.1 (33.4)
Mean daily maximum °F (°C)	46.6 (8.1)	50.8 (10.4)	59.2 (15.1)	68.8 (20.4)	74.8 (23.8)	80.2 (26.8)	82.9 (28.3)	81.9 (27.7)	77.5 (25.3)	68.5 (20.3)	58.1 (14.5)	49.5 (9.7)	66.6 (19.2)
Daily mean °F (°C)	36.6 (2.6)	39.9 (4.4)	46.9 (8.3)	55.4 (13.0)	62.8 (17.1)	69.5 (20.8)	72.8 (22.7)	71.8 (22.1)	66.8 (19.3)	56.4 (13.6)	45.9 (7.7)	39.5 (4.2)	55.3 (12.9)
Mean daily minimum °F (°C)	26.6 (−3.0)	28.9 (−1.7)	34.6 (1.4)	42.0 (5.6)	50.9 (10.5)	58.7 (14.8)	62.7 (17.1)	61.6 (16.4)	56.1 (13.4)	44.2 (6.8)	33.7 (0.9)	29.4 (−1.4)	44.1 (6.7)
Mean minimum °F (°C)	8.2 (−13.2)	13.3 (−10.4)	19.9 (−6.7)	27.6 (−2.4)	36.0 (2.2)	48.0 (8.9)	54.9 (12.7)	53.3 (11.8)	43.1 (6.2)	29.4 (−1.4)	21.0 (−6.1)	15.4 (−9.2)	5.4 (−14.8)
Record low °F (°C)	−18 (−28)	−13 (−25)	−6 (−21)	16 (−9)	26 (−3)	33 (1)	43 (6)	40 (4)	27 (−3)	15 (−9)	2 (−17)	−12 (−24)	−18 (−28)
Average precipitation inches (mm)	4.75 (121)	4.27 (108)	5.58 (142)	4.93 (125)	5.50 (140)	5.99 (152)	6.31 (160)	4.40 (112)	4.34 (110)	3.19 (81)	4.02 (102)	4.92 (125)	58.20 (1,478)
Average snowfall inches (cm)	2.4 (6.1)	2.4 (6.1)	1.3 (3.3)	0.0 (0.0)	0.0 (0.0)	0.0 (0.0)	0.0 (0.0)	0.0 (0.0)	0.0 (0.0)	0.0 (0.0)	0.2 (0.51)	1.4 (3.6)	7.7 (20)
Average precipitation days (≥ 0.01 in)	15.1	14.5	14.7	12.5	14.8	15.1	15.4	13.8	10.9	9.9	11.6	15.2	163.5
Average snowy days (≥ 0.1 in)	2.0	1.7	0.9	0.0	0.0	0.0	0.0	0.0	0.0	0.0	0.2	1.0	5.8
Source: NOAA

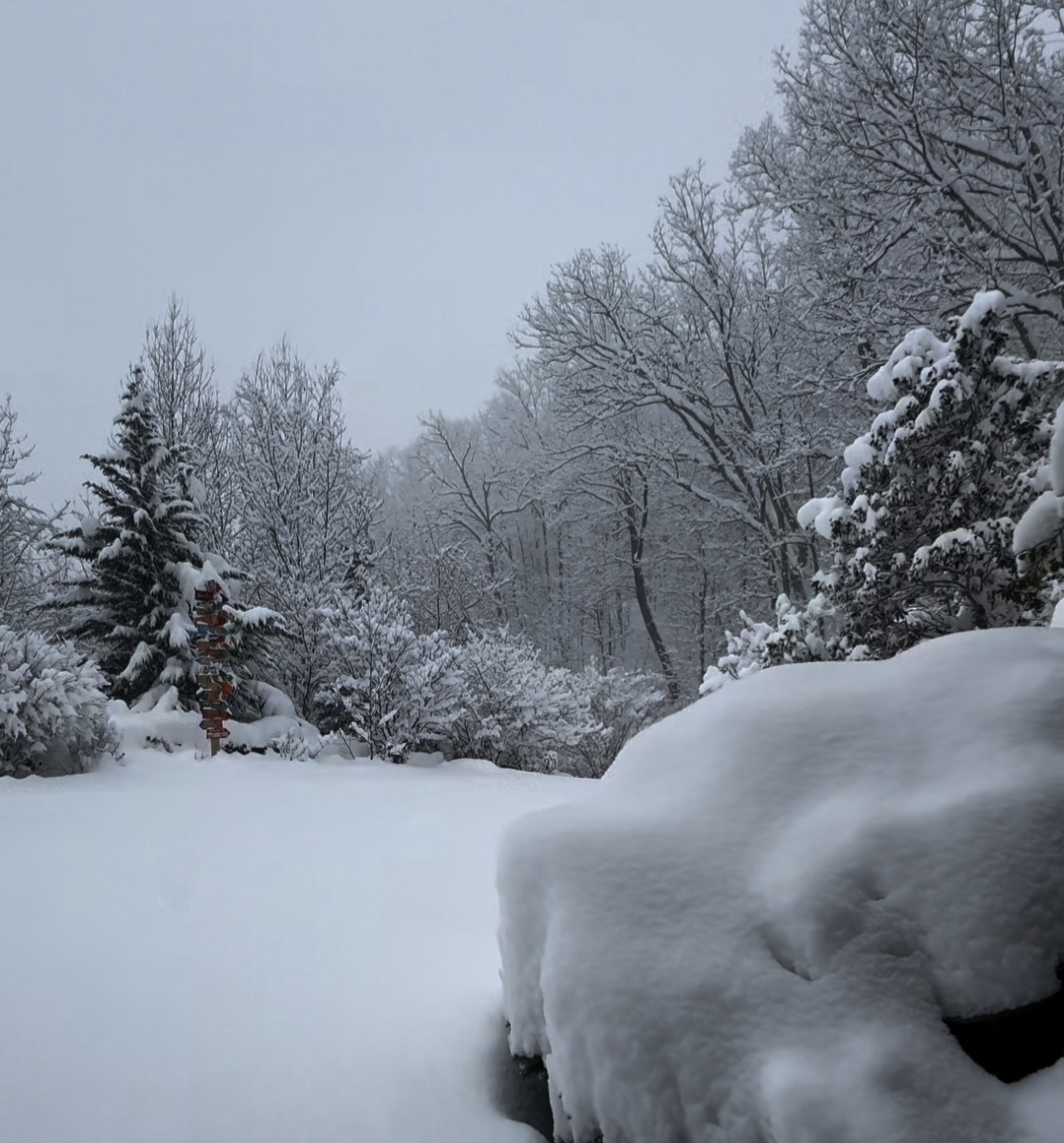
Heavy snowfall in the Smoky Mountains

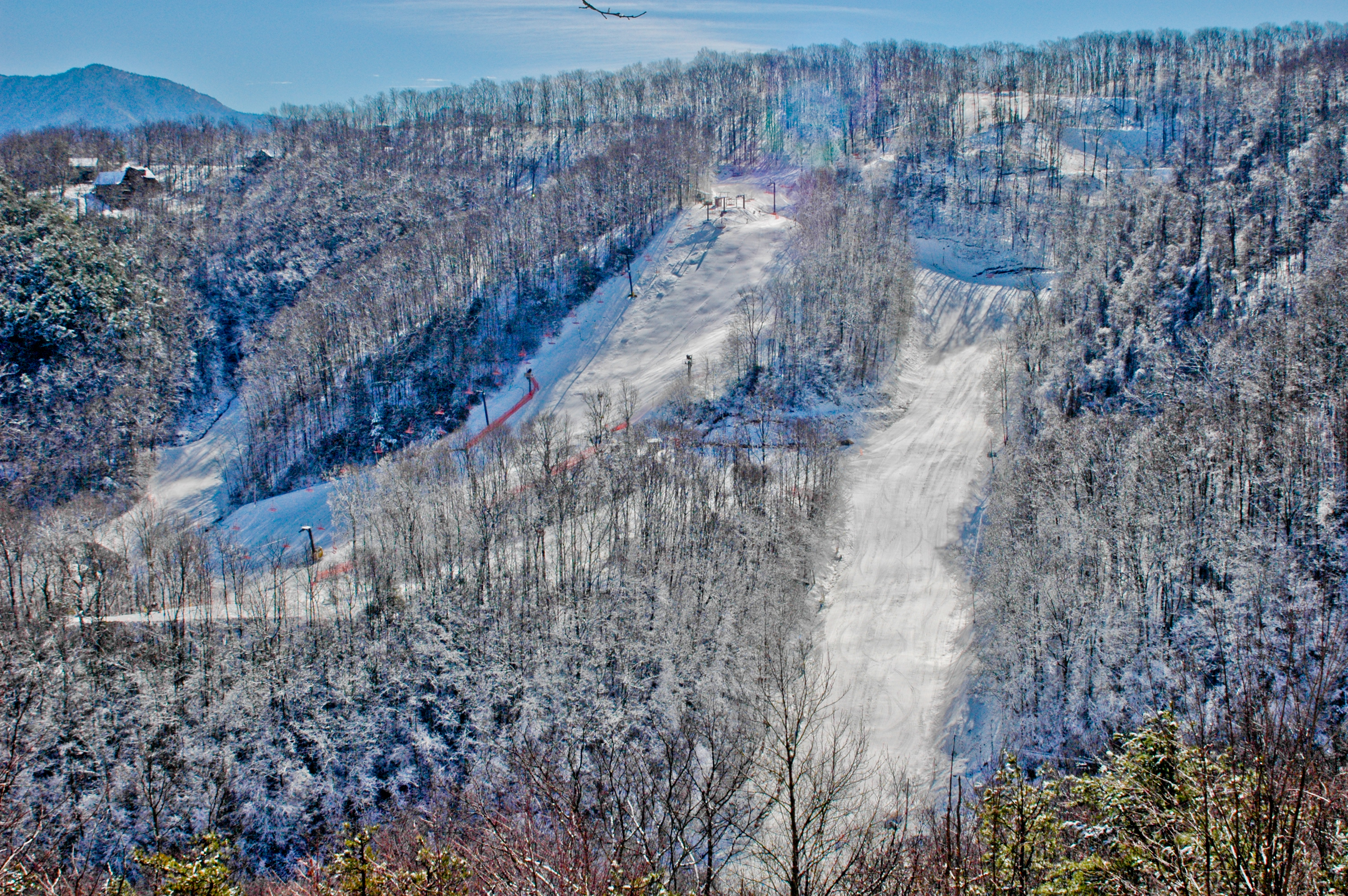
Snowy Ober Trails

== Demographics ==
Historical population
Census	Pop.	Note	%±
1950	1,301		—
1960	1,764		35.6%
1970	2,329		32.0%
1980	3,210		37.8%
1990	3,417		6.4%
2000	3,382		−1.0%
2010	3,944		16.6%
2020	3,577		−9.3%
2024 (est.)	3,703		3.5%

=== Racial and ethnic composition ===
Gatlinburg city, Tennessee – Racial and ethnic composition Note: the US Census treats Hispanic/Latino as an ethnic category. This table excludes Latinos from the racial categories and assigns them to a separate category. Hispanics/Latinos may be of any race.
Race / Ethnicity (NH = Non-Hispanic)	Pop 2000	Pop 2010	Pop 2020	% 2000	% 2010	% 2020
White alone (NH)	3,211	3,162	2,735	94.94%	80.17%	76.46%
Black or African American alone (NH)	5	20	15	0.15%	0.51%	0.42%
Native American or Alaska Native alone (NH)	17	16	13	0.50%	0.41%	0.36%
Asian alone (NH)	58	111	71	1.71%	2.81%	1.98%
Native Hawaiian or Pacific Islander alone (NH)	1	1	4	0.03%	0.03%	0.11%
Other race alone (NH)	3	4	14	0.09%	0.10%	0.39%
Mixed race or Multiracial (NH)	21	37	90	0.62%	0.94%	2.52%
Hispanic or Latino (any race)	66	593	635	1.95%	15.04%	17.75%
Total	3,382	3,944	3,577	100.00%	100.00%	100.00%

=== 2020 census ===
As of the 2020 census, there was a population of 3,577, with 1,551 households and 1,012 families residing in the city.

The median age was 47.8 years. 17.0% of residents were under the age of 18 and 23.8% of residents were 65 years of age or older. For every 100 females there were 99.9 males, and for every 100 females age 18 and over there were 99.1 males age 18 and over.

0.0% of residents lived in urban areas, while 100.0% lived in rural areas.

There were 1,551 households in Gatlinburg, of which 23.0% had children under the age of 18 living in them. Of all households, 45.4% were married-couple households, 22.4% were households with a male householder and no spouse or partner present, and 24.9% were households with a female householder and no spouse or partner present. About 30.3% of all households were made up of individuals and 12.7% had someone living alone who was 65 years of age or older.

There were 4,540 housing units, of which 65.8% were vacant. The homeowner vacancy rate was 1.3% and the rental vacancy rate was 31.7%.

Racial composition as of the 2020 census
Race	Number	Percent
White	2,809	78.5%
Black or African American	15	0.4%
American Indian and Alaska Native	20	0.6%
Asian	72	2.0%
Native Hawaiian and Other Pacific Islander	4	0.1%
Some other race	395	11.0%
Two or more races	262	7.3%

=== 2010 census ===
As of the 2010 census, Gatlinburg had 3,944 people, 1,681 households, and 1,019 families residing in the city with 5,825 housing units available. The racial makeup of the city was 85.3% White, 0.6% African American, 0.4% American Indian/Alaska Native, 2.8% Asian, 0.0% Pacific Islander, 8.9% from other races, and 1.9% from two or more races. Hispanic or Latino of any race accounted for 15% of the population.

Of the 1,681 households, 22.8% had children under the age of 18 living in them, 44.1% were married couples living together, 10.1% had a female householder with no husband present, 6.5% had a male householder with no wife present, and 39.4% were non-families. Individuals living alone accounted for 29.4% of the non-family households, and 11.3% of those living alone were 65 years of age or older. The average household size was 2.33, and the average family size was 2.8.

The city's population consisted of 18.5% of individuals under the age of 20, 5.9% from 20 to 24, 25.9% from 25 to 44, 31.2% from 45 to 64, and 18.5% 65 years of age or older. The median age was 44.7 years. The ratio of males to females was almost equivalent at 1.02:1 (1,990 males to 1,954 females). For adult individuals 18 or older, the ratio of males to females was also very close at 1.03:1 (1,671 males to 1,628 females).

According to data in the 2012–2016 American Community Survey 5-Year Estimates conducted by the U.S. Census Bureau for Gatlinburg, the median income for a household in Gatlinburg was estimated at $36,445, with an estimated median family income of $42,903. For individuals who were employed full-time, males had a median income of $30,159 versus $24,528 for females. The per capita income for the city was $24,423, and 15% of the population and 5.8% of families had income levels below the poverty line. 13.8% of those under the age of 18 and 8.3% of those 65 years and older were living below the poverty line.

As of July 1, 2017, the 2017 estimated population of Gatlinburg had increased to 4,163.

== Economy ==
=== Tourism ===
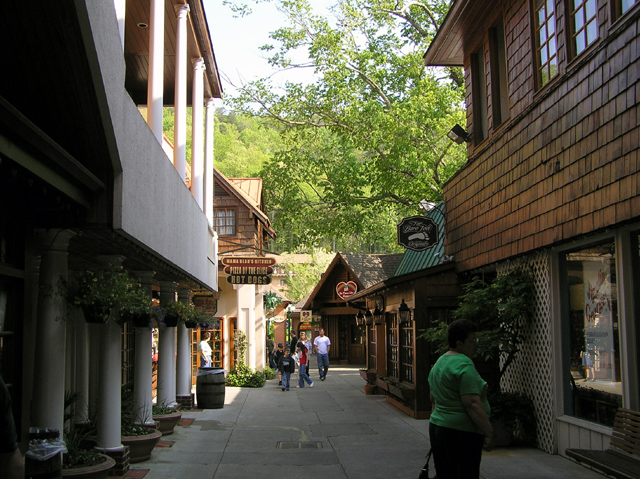
Shops in Gatlinburg

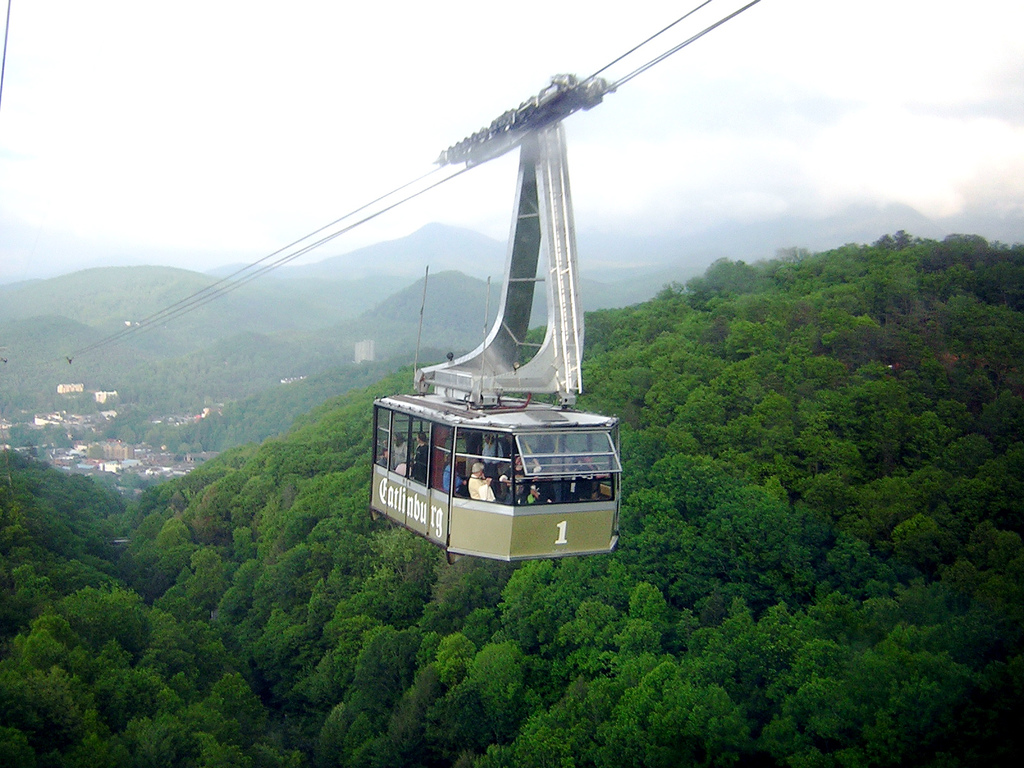
Ober Gatlinburg aerial tramway

As the gateway community for Great Smoky Mountains National Park, Gatlinburg is an important tourist destination in Tennessee, with many man-made attractions. The Gatlinburg Trolley, a privately funded public transit system, caters to area tourists. The Gatlinburg SkyLift takes visitors up 1,800 feet (550 m) to the top of Crockett Mountain, to the longest footbridge in the US which spans two mountains.

Ober Mountain is the only ski resort in the state. It has eight ski trails, three chair lifts, and a wildlife encounter area and is accessible by road or aerial tramway. Originally known as Ober Gatlinburg, it was rebranded following its purchase in 2022 by local entrepreneur Joe Baker.

Gatlinburg Space Needle provides views of the Smoky Mountains.

The Gatlinburg Arts and Crafts Community is an 8-mile (13 km) loop located on the north side of town that focuses on preserving traditional mountain crafts.

The Ripley's group of attractions includes Ripley's Aquarium of the Smokies and a number of themed exhibits.

Theme parks Dollywood and Dollywood's Splash Country—both named for Dolly Parton—are located in nearby Pigeon Forge.

Museums include the Museum of Salt and Pepper Shakers.

Gatlinburg has numbered intersections in the core of the town. The numbers hang from traffic lights or signs and are written on official tourist maps.

During the Christmas season, the downtown area is decorated with lights for a "Winterfest Celebration", with a trolley service and shuttle bus available.

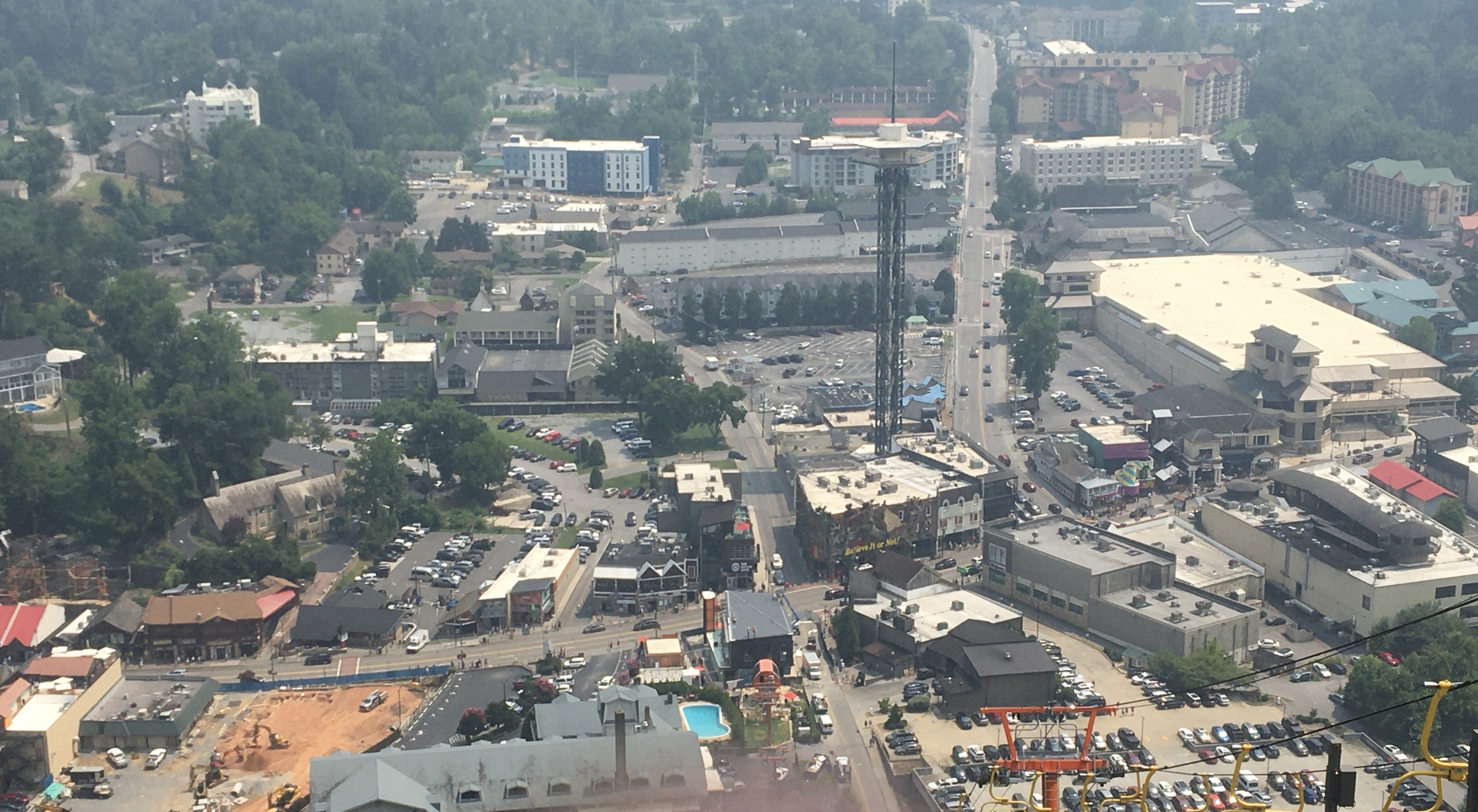
An aerial view of Downtown Gatlinburg in July 2023

Because of the ease of obtaining a marriage license in Tennessee, Gatlinburg is a popular destination for weddings and honeymoons.

=== Convention Center ===
The Gatlinburg Convention Center has over 67,000 square feet (6,200 m^{2}) of exhibit space.

The Convention Center hosts the annual week-long Gatlinburg Regional, the largest non-National bridge tournament in the U.S., which attracts over 3,000 players.

== Law enforcement agencies ==
The Gatlinburg Police Department is the primary law enforcement organization serving Gatlinburg, Tennessee in the United States. The department has a staff of 45 officers and 10 support personnel. The department maintains a large force size for a small town primarily due to the large volume of tourists that pass through the area annually. Mike Werner has served as the mayor of Gatlinburg for 15 years.

== Education ==
Sevier County School District is the sole school district in the county.

Schools include:

- Gatlinburg-Pittman High School
- Gatlinburg-Pittman Junior High School
- Pi Beta Phi Elementary School
- Pittman Center Elementary School

== Notable people ==
- Felice and Boudleaux Bryant: Songwriting duo, who lived in Gatlinburg from 1978 onward, where they wrote numerous songs such as Rocky Top. They lived in the Gatlinburg Inn, and afterwards in The Bryant House which still hosts a museum with their belongings.
- Travis Meadows (born 1965): A country music singer and songwriter who has written songs for stars like Eric Church, Wynonna Judd and Dierks Bentley, Meadows started his songwriting career while living in Gatlinburg.
- John Reagan (1818–1905): Born in Gatlinburg, Reagan moved to Texas as an adult and became a career politician who served in the Texas House of Representatives, the U.S. House of Representatives, the U.S. Senate, and as Postmaster General and Secretary of the Treasury for the Confederate States of America.
