= Gatlinburg Space Needle =

Observation tower in Gatlinburg, Tennessee, US

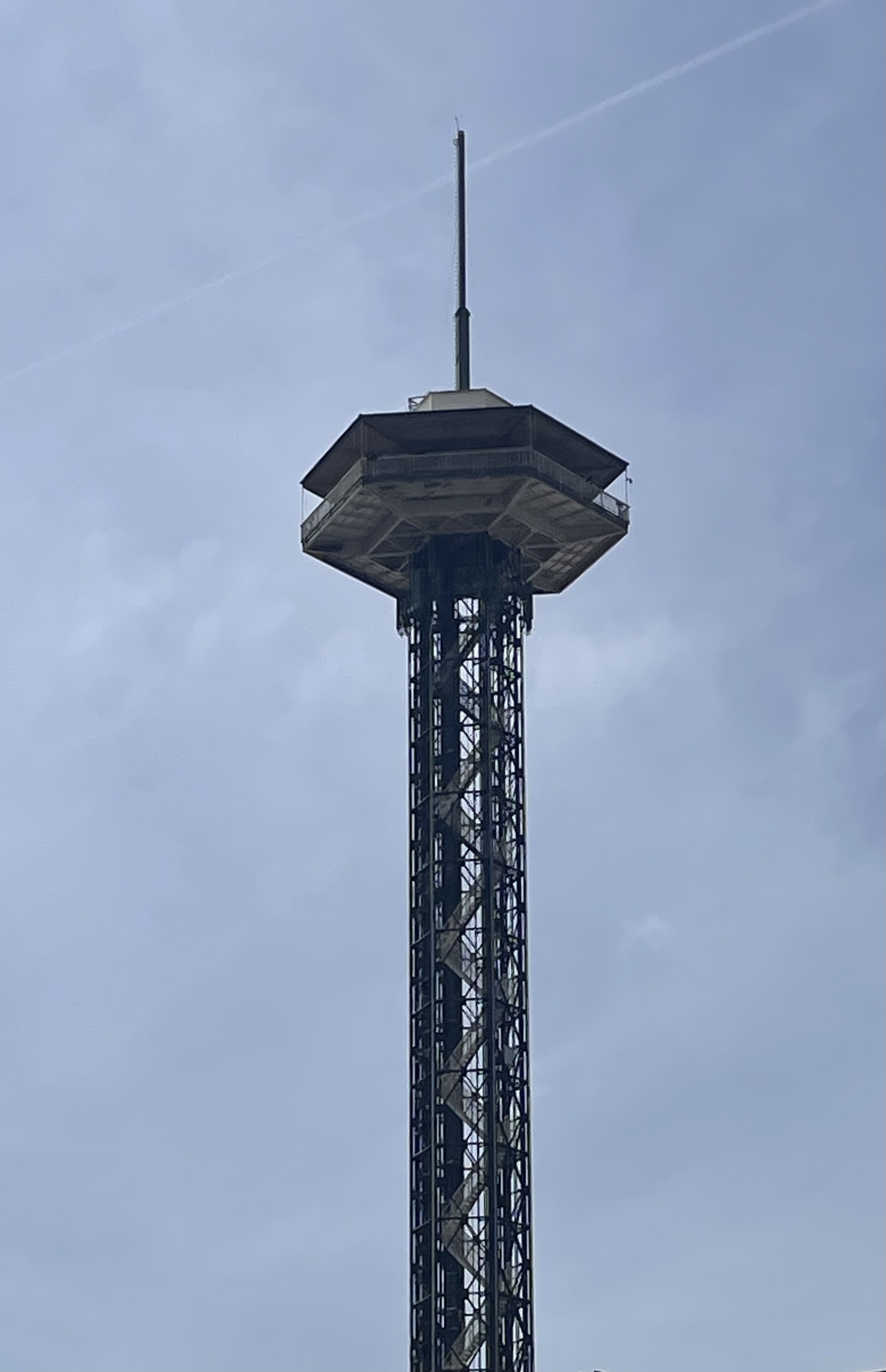
- Gatlinburg Space Needle in 2025
- Interactive map of the Gatlinburg Space Needle area

General information
- Type: observation, tourist attraction
- Location: Gatlinburg, Tennessee, United States
- Coordinates: 35°42′39″N 83°31′07″W
- Construction started: 1968
- Completed: 1969

Height
- Roof: 407 feet (124 m)
- Top floor: 342 feet (104 m) (observation deck)

Technical details
- Floor count: 3
- Lifts/elevators: 2

The Gatlinburg Space Needle is a 407-foot (124 m) tall observation tower in Gatlinburg, Tennessee, United States. The tower has an outdoor observation deck that provides a 360 degree view of the Great Smoky Mountains and the city of Gatlinburg. Upon completion in 1969, it was the second tallest tower in the state of Tennessee. Currently it is the fifth tallest in the state, after several non-guyed TV and radio towers.

Along with being the tallest structure in the city of Gatlinburg, the Space Needle base also hosts an arcade with video games, escape games and the Impossibilities magic show theater.
