= First Methodist Church, Gatlinburg =

Historic church in Tennessee, United States

- U.S. National Register of Historic Places
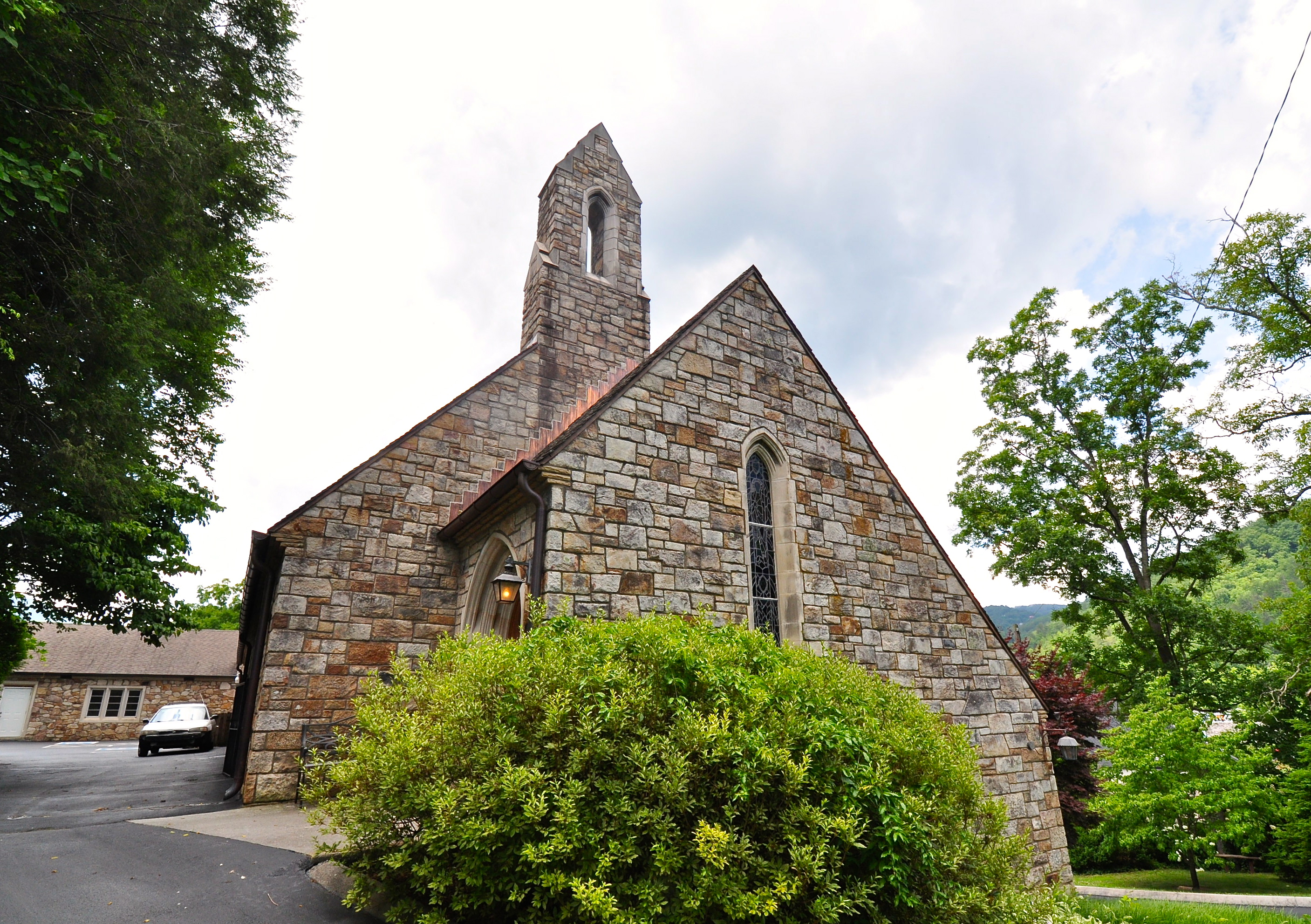
- First Methodist Church, June 2014.

- Location within Tennessee Location within the United States
- Location: 742 Parkway, Gatlinburg, Tennessee
- Coordinates: 35°42′41″N 83°31′2″W
- Area: 1 acre (0.40 ha)
- Built: 1945-1950, 1961
- Architect: Charles I. Barber; Barber & McMurry
- Architectural style: Late Gothic Revival
- NRHP reference No.: 07000661
- Added to NRHP: July 3, 2007

First Methodist Church, Gatlinburg, also known as Gatlinburg First United Methodist Church, in Gatlinburg, Tennessee was designed by Charles I. Barber in Late Gothic Revival style. It was built during 1945–1950, with first worship in 1947. A second building, its education building, and a porch that joins them, was completed in 1961. Both were designed by architectural firm Barber and McMurry. The building was listed on the U.S. National Register of Historic Places in 2007 for its architecture.

It is located on a hillside above the main area of Gatlinburg. The original building is built of Crab Orchard stone from Bluff Mountain, used in foundation and exterior walls, Indiana limestone around the doors and windows, and Illinois slate shingles for the roofs.
