= Glen Craig, Knoxville =

Coordinates: 35.9216°N 83.9980°W

Glen Craig is a historic home located at 6304 Westland Drive in Knoxville, Tennessee. The land was originally granted to William Lyon. The house was built in 1888 as a summer home of John Craig Jr., who was married to a daughter of William Lyon.

In 1926, the Craigs converted the summer residence to a year-around residence. They retained noted architect Charles I. Barber of Barber & McMurry Architects to remodel the house and design additions in the Tudor Revival style. The gardens were designed by Charles Lester. Barber also designed the showroom for the Candoro Marble Works, a subsidiary of Craig's marble company.
