= Gatlinburg Regional =

The Gatlinburg Regional is the largest of over 100 regional tournaments sponsored by the American Contract Bridge League (ACBL).

The week-long tournament attracts the top bridge players from all over the world.

The tournament is typically held in April and lasts a week. The tournament features pair events and team events - Swiss, Bracketed Swiss, Board-a-Match (BAM) and KO. The KO events are the largest events held by the ACBL throughout the year, typically attracting over 300 entries daily.

== Attendance ==
The tournament was originally held every two years starting in 1968. After 1980, it became an annual event.

A table is four players playing for a single session (approximately 3 hours).

Year	Tables
1968	2118.5
1970	1819
1972	2143
1973	1753
1976	1959
1977	1944.5
1978	2010.5
1980	1916.5
1981	2166
1982	2509
1983	2283
1984	2392
1985	2306
1986	2650
1987	2086
1988	2753
1989	2655
1990	3518
1991	3601
1992	4528.5
1993	5099.5
1994	5415.5
1995	5762
1996	6037.5
1997	5935.5
1998	5582
1999	5671.5
2000	5952
2001	6220
2002	7044.5
2003	7424
2004	8208
2005	9095.5
2006	9564.5
2007	10544
2008	10343
2009	9732
2010	10064
2011	8917.5
2012	9114
2013	9260.5
2014	8775.5
2015	8649
2016	8322.5
2017	7936
2018	8109
2019	7193
2020	Cancelled (Covid)
2021	Cancelled (Covid)
2022	3108
2023	3612
2024	3485
